The Industrial Revolution was the transition to new manufacturing processes in Great Britain, continental Europe, and the United States, that occurred during the period from around 1760 to about 1820–1840. This transition included going from hand production methods to machines; new chemical manufacturing and iron production processes; the increasing use of water power and steam power; the development of machine tools; and the rise of the mechanized factory system. Output greatly increased, and a result was an unprecedented rise in population and in the rate of population growth. The textile industry was the first to use modern production methods, and textiles became the dominant industry in terms of employment, value of output, and capital invested. 

The Industrial Revolution began in Great Britain, and many of the technological and architectural innovations were of British origin. By the mid-18th century, Britain was the world's leading commercial nation, controlling a global trading empire with colonies in North America and the Caribbean. Britain had major military and political hegemony on the Indian subcontinent; particularly with the proto-industrialised Mughal Bengal, through the activities of the East India Company. The development of trade and the rise of business were among the major causes of the Industrial Revolution.

The Industrial Revolution marked a major turning point in history.  Comparable only to humanity's adoption of agriculture with respect to material advancement, the Industrial Revolution influenced in some way almost every aspect of daily life. In particular, average income and population began to exhibit unprecedented sustained growth. Some economists have said the most important effect of the Industrial Revolution was that the standard of living for the general population in the Western world began to increase consistently for the first time in history, although others have said that it did not begin to meaningfully improve until the late 19th and 20th centuries. GDP per capita was broadly stable before the Industrial Revolution and the emergence of the modern capitalist economy, while the Industrial Revolution began an era of per-capita economic growth in capitalist economies. Economic historians are in agreement that the onset of the Industrial Revolution is the most important event in human history since the domestication of animals and plants.

The precise start and end of the Industrial Revolution is still debated among historians, as is the pace of economic and social changes. Eric Hobsbawm held that the Industrial Revolution began in Britain in the 1780s and was not fully felt until the 1830s or 1840s, while T. S. Ashton held that it occurred roughly between 1760 and 1830. Rapid industrialisation first began in Britain, starting with mechanized textiles spinning in the 1780s, with high rates of growth in steam power and iron production occurring after 1800. Mechanized textile production spread from Great Britain to continental Europe and the United States in the early 19th century, with important centres of textiles, iron and coal emerging in Belgium and the United States and later textiles in France.

An economic recession occurred from the late 1830s to the early 1840s when the adoption of the Industrial Revolution's early innovations, such as mechanized spinning and weaving, slowed and their markets matured. Innovations developed late in the period, such as the increasing adoption of locomotives, steamboats and steamships, and hot blast iron smelting. New technologies such as the electrical telegraph, widely introduced in the 1840s and 1850s, were not powerful enough to drive high rates of growth. Rapid economic growth began to occur after 1870, springing from a new group of innovations in what has been called the Second Industrial Revolution. These innovations included new steel making processes, mass production, assembly lines, electrical grid systems, the large-scale manufacture of machine tools, and the use of increasingly advanced machinery in steam-powered factories.

Etymology
The earliest recorded use of the term "Industrial Revolution" was in July 1799 by French envoy Louis-Guillaume Otto, announcing that France had entered the race to industrialise. In his 1976 book Keywords: A Vocabulary of Culture and Society, Raymond Williams states in the entry for "Industry": "The idea of a new social order based on major industrial change was clear in Southey and Owen, between 1811 and 1818, and was implicit as early as Blake in the early 1790s and Wordsworth at the turn of the [19th] century." The term Industrial Revolution applied to technological change was becoming more common by the late 1830s, as in Jérôme-Adolphe Blanqui's description in 1837 of la révolution industrielle.

Friedrich Engels in The Condition of the Working Class in England in 1844 spoke of "an industrial revolution, a revolution which at the same time changed the whole of civil society". Although Engels wrote his book in the 1840s, it was not translated into English until the late 19th century, and his expression did not enter everyday language until then. Credit for popularising the term may be given to Arnold Toynbee, whose 1881 lectures gave a detailed account of the term.

Economic historians and authors such as Mendels, Pomeranz, and Kridte argue that proto-industrialization in parts of Europe, the Muslim world, Mughal India, and China created the social and economic conditions that led to the Industrial Revolution, thus causing the Great Divergence.*  Some historians, such as John Clapham and Nicholas Crafts, have argued that the economic and social changes occurred gradually and that the term revolution is a misnomer. This is still a subject of debate among some historians.

Requirements
Six factors facilitated industrialization: high levels of agricultural productivity to provide excess manpower and food; a pool of managerial and entrepreneurial skills;  available ports, rivers, canals, and roads to cheaply move raw materials and outputs; natural resources such as coal, iron, and waterfalls; political stability and a legal system that supported business; and financial capital available to invest. Once industrialization began in Great Britain, new factors can be added: the eagerness of British entrepreneurs to export industrial expertise and the willingness to import the process. Britain met the criteria and industrialized starting in the 18th century, and then it exported the process to western Europe (especially Belgium, France, and the German states) in the early 19th century. The United States copied the British model in the early 19th century, and Japan copied the Western European models in the late 19th century.

Important technological developments
The commencement of the Industrial Revolution is closely linked to a small number of innovations, beginning in the second half of the 18th century.  By the 1830s, the following gains had been made in important technologies:
 Textiles – mechanised cotton spinning powered by steam or water increased the output of a worker by a factor of around 500. The power loom increased the output of a worker by a factor of over 40. The cotton gin increased productivity of removing seed from cotton by a factor of 50. Large gains in productivity also occurred in spinning and weaving of wool and linen, but they were not as great as in cotton.
 Steam power – the efficiency of steam engines increased so that they used between one-fifth and one-tenth as much fuel. The adaptation of stationary steam engines to rotary motion made them suitable for industrial uses. The high-pressure engine had a high power-to-weight ratio, making it suitable for transportation. Steam power underwent a rapid expansion after 1800.
 Iron making – the substitution of coke for charcoal greatly lowered the fuel cost of pig iron and wrought iron production. Using coke also allowed larger blast furnaces, resulting in economies of scale. The steam engine began being used to power blast air (indirectly by pumping water to a water wheel) in the 1750s, enabling a large increase in iron production by overcoming the limitation of water power. The cast iron blowing cylinder was first used in 1760. It was later improved by making it double acting, which allowed higher blast furnace temperatures. The puddling process produced a structural grade iron at a lower cost than the finery forge. The rolling mill was fifteen times faster than hammering wrought iron. Developed in 1828, hot blast greatly increased fuel efficiency in iron production in the following decades.
 Invention of machine tools – the first machine tools were invented included the screw-cutting lathe, the cylinder boring machine, and the milling machine. Machine tools made the economical manufacture of precision metal parts possible, although it took several decades to develop effective techniques.

Textile manufacture

British textile industry statistics

In 1750 Britain imported 2.5 million pounds of raw cotton, most of which was spun and woven by the cottage industry in Lancashire. The work was done by hand in workers' homes or occasionally in master weavers' shops. Wages in Lancashire were about six times those in India in 1770 when overall productivity in Britain was about three times higher than in India. In 1787 raw cotton consumption was 22 million pounds, most of which was cleaned, carded, and spun on machines. The British textile industry used 52 million pounds of cotton in 1800, which increased to 588 million pounds in 1850.

The share of value added by the cotton textile industry in Britain was 2.6% in 1760, 17% in 1801, and 22.4% in 1831. Value added by the British woollen industry was 14.1% in 1801. Cotton factories in Britain numbered approximately 900 in 1797.  In 1760 approximately one-third of cotton cloth manufactured in Britain was exported, rising to two-thirds by 1800. In 1781 cotton spun amounted to 5.1 million pounds, which increased to 56 million pounds by 1800. In 1800 less than 0.1% of world cotton cloth was produced on machinery invented in Britain. In 1788 there were 50,000 spindles in Britain, rising to 7 million over the next 30 years.

Wool
The earliest European attempts at mechanized spinning were with wool; however, wool spinning proved more difficult to mechanize than cotton.  Productivity improvement in wool spinning during the Industrial Revolution was significant but far less than that of cotton.

Silk

Arguably the first highly mechanised factory was John Lombe's water-powered silk mill at Derby, operational by 1721. Lombe learned silk thread manufacturing by taking a job in Italy and acting as an industrial spy; however, because the Italian silk industry guarded its secrets closely, the state of the industry at that time is unknown. Although Lombe's factory was technically successful, the supply of raw silk from Italy was cut off to eliminate competition. In order to promote manufacturing, the Crown paid for models of Lombe's machinery which were exhibited in the Tower of London.

Cotton
Parts of India, China, Central America, South America, and the Middle East have a long history of hand manufacturing cotton textiles, which became a major industry sometime after 1000 AD. In tropical and subtropical regions where it was grown, most was grown by small farmers alongside their food crops and was spun and woven in households, largely for domestic consumption.  In the 15th century, China began to require households to pay part of their taxes in cotton cloth. By the 17th century, almost all Chinese wore cotton clothing. Almost everywhere cotton cloth could be used as a medium of exchange. In India, a significant amount of cotton textiles were manufactured for distant markets, often produced by professional weavers. Some merchants also owned small weaving workshops. India produced a variety of cotton cloth, some of exceptionally fine quality.

Cotton was a difficult raw material for Europe to obtain before it was grown on colonial plantations in the Americas. The early Spanish explorers found Native Americans growing unknown species of excellent quality cotton: sea island cotton (Gossypium barbadense) and upland green seeded cotton Gossypium hirsutum. Sea island cotton grew in tropical areas and on barrier islands of Georgia and South Carolina but did poorly inland. Sea island cotton began being exported from Barbados in the 1650s. Upland green seeded cotton grew well on inland areas of the southern U.S. but was not economical because of the difficulty of removing seed, a problem solved by the cotton gin. A strain of cotton seed brought from Mexico to Natchez, Mississippi, in 1806 became the parent genetic material for over 90% of world cotton production today; it produced bolls that were three to four times faster to pick.

Trade and textiles

The Age of Discovery was followed by a period of colonialism beginning around the 16th century. Following the discovery of a trade route to India around southern Africa by the Portuguese, the British founded the East India Company, along with smaller companies of different nationalities which established trading posts and employed agents to engage in trade throughout the Indian Ocean region.

One of the largest segments of this trade was in cotton textiles, which were purchased in India and sold in Southeast Asia, including the Indonesian archipelago where spices were purchased for sale to Southeast Asia and Europe. By the mid-1760s cloth was over three-quarters of the East India Company's exports. Indian textiles were in demand in the North Atlantic region of Europe where previously only wool and linen were available; however, the number of cotton goods consumed in Western Europe was minor until the early 19th century.

Pre-mechanized European textile production

By 1600 Flemish refugees began weaving cotton cloth in English towns where cottage spinning and weaving of wool and linen was well established. They were left alone by the guilds who did not consider cotton a threat. Earlier European attempts at cotton spinning and weaving were in 12th-century Italy and 15th-century southern Germany, but these industries eventually ended when the supply of cotton was cut off.  The Moors in Spain grew, spun, and wove cotton beginning around the 10th century.

British cloth could not compete with Indian cloth because India's labour cost was approximately one-fifth to one-sixth that of Britain's. In 1700 and 1721 the British government passed Calico Acts to protect the domestic woollen and linen industries from the increasing amounts of cotton fabric imported from India.

The demand for heavier fabric was met by a domestic industry based around Lancashire that produced fustian, a cloth with flax warp and cotton weft.  Flax was used for the warp because wheel-spun cotton did not have sufficient strength, but the resulting blend was not as soft as 100% cotton and was more difficult to sew.

On the eve of the Industrial Revolution, spinning and weaving were done in households, for domestic consumption, and as a cottage industry under the putting-out system.  Occasionally the work was done in the workshop of a master weaver. Under the putting-out system, home-based workers produced under contract to merchant sellers, who often supplied the raw materials. In the off-season the women, typically farmers' wives, did the spinning and the men did the weaving.  Using the spinning wheel, it took anywhere from four to eight spinners to supply one handloom weaver.

Invention of textile machinery
The flying shuttle, patented in 1733 by John Kay—with a number of subsequent improvements including an important one in 1747—doubled the output of a weaver, worsening the imbalance between spinning and weaving. It became widely used around Lancashire after 1760 when John's son, Robert, invented the dropbox, which facilitated changing thread colors.

Lewis Paul patented the roller spinning frame and the flyer-and-bobbin system for drawing wool to a more even thickness. The technology was developed with the help of John Wyatt of Birmingham. Paul and Wyatt opened a mill in Birmingham which used their rolling machine powered by a donkey. In 1743 a factory opened in Northampton with 50 spindles on each of five of Paul and Wyatt's machines. This operated until about 1764. A similar mill was built by Daniel Bourn in Leominster, but this burnt down. Both Lewis Paul and Daniel Bourn patented carding machines in 1748. Based on two sets of rollers that travelled at different speeds, it was later used in the first cotton spinning mill. 

In 1764 in the village of Stanhill, Lancashire, James Hargreaves invented the spinning jenny, which he patented in 1770. It was the first practical spinning frame with multiple spindles. The jenny worked in a similar manner to the spinning wheel, by first clamping down on the fibres, then by drawing them out, followed by twisting. It was a simple, wooden framed machine that only cost about £6 for a 40-spindle model in 1792 and was used mainly by home spinners. The jenny produced a lightly twisted yarn only suitable for weft, not warp.

The spinning frame or water frame was developed by Richard Arkwright who, along with two partners, patented it in 1769. The design was partly based on a spinning machine built by Kay, who was hired by Arkwright. For each spindle the water frame used a series of four pairs of rollers, each operating at a successively higher rotating speed, to draw out the fibre which was then twisted by the spindle. The roller spacing was slightly longer than the fibre length. Too close a spacing caused the fibres to break while too distant a spacing caused uneven thread. The top rollers were leather-covered and loading on the rollers was applied by a weight. The weights kept the twist from backing up before the rollers. The bottom rollers were wood and metal, with fluting along the length. The water frame was able to produce a hard, medium-count thread suitable for warp, finally allowing 100% cotton cloth to be made in Britain. Arkwright and his partners used water power at a factory in Cromford, Derbyshire in 1771, giving the invention its name.

Samuel Crompton's spinning mule was introduced in 1779. Mule implies a hybrid because it was a combination of the spinning jenny and the water frame, in which the spindles were placed on a carriage, which went through an operational sequence during which the rollers stopped while the carriage moved away from the drawing roller to finish drawing out the fibres as the spindles started rotating. Crompton's mule was able to produce finer thread than hand spinning and at a lower cost. Mule-spun thread was of suitable strength to be used as a warp and finally allowed Britain to produce highly competitive yarn in large quantities.

Realising that the expiration of the Arkwright patent would greatly increase the supply of spun cotton and lead to a shortage of weavers, Edmund Cartwright developed a vertical power loom which he patented in 1785. In 1776 he patented a two-man operated loom. Cartwright's loom design had several flaws, the most serious being thread breakage. Samuel Horrocks patented a fairly successful loom in 1813. Horock's loom was improved by Richard Roberts in 1822, and these were produced in large numbers by Roberts, Hill & Co.

The demand for cotton presented an opportunity to planters in the Southern United States, who thought upland cotton would be a profitable crop if a better way could be found to remove the seed. Eli Whitney responded to the challenge by inventing the inexpensive cotton gin. A man using a cotton gin could remove seed from as much upland cotton in one day as would previously have taken two months to process, working at the rate of one pound of cotton per day.

These advances were capitalised on by entrepreneurs, of whom the best known is Arkwright. He is credited with a list of inventions, but these were actually developed by such people as Kay and Thomas Highs; Arkwright nurtured the inventors, patented the ideas, financed the initiatives, and protected the machines. He created the cotton mill which brought the production processes together in a factory, and he developed the use of powerfirst horsepower and then water powerwhich made cotton manufacture a mechanised industry. Other inventors increased the efficiency of the individual steps of spinning (carding, twisting and spinning, and rolling) so that the supply of yarn increased greatly. Steam power was then applied to drive textile machinery. Manchester acquired the nickname Cottonopolis during the early 19th century owing to its sprawl of textile factories.

Although mechanization dramatically decreased the cost of cotton cloth, by the mid-19th century machine-woven cloth still could not equal the quality of hand-woven Indian cloth, in part because of the fineness of thread made possible by the type of cotton used in India, which allowed high thread counts. However, the high productivity of British textile manufacturing allowed coarser grades of British cloth to undersell hand-spun and woven fabric in low-wage India, eventually destroying the Indian industry.

Iron industry

British iron production statistics
Bar iron was the commodity form of iron used as the raw material for making hardware goods such as nails, wire, hinges, horseshoes, wagon tires, chains, etc., as well as structural shapes. A small amount of bar iron was converted into steel. Cast iron was used for pots, stoves, and other items where its brittleness was tolerable. Most cast iron was refined and converted to bar iron, with substantial losses. Bar iron was made by the bloomery process, which was the predominant iron smelting process until the late 18th century.

In the UK in 1720, there were 20,500 tons of cast iron produced with charcoal and 400 tons with coke. In 1750 charcoal iron production was 24,500 and coke iron was 2,500 tons. In 1788 the production of charcoal cast iron was 14,000 tons while coke iron production was 54,000 tons. In 1806 charcoal cast iron production was 7,800 tons and coke cast iron was 250,000 tons.

In 1750 the UK imported 31,200 tons of bar iron and either refined from cast iron or directly produced 18,800 tons of bar iron using charcoal and 100 tons using coke. In 1796 the UK was making 125,000 tons of bar iron with coke and 6,400 tons with charcoal; imports were 38,000 tons and exports were 24,600 tons. In 1806 the UK did not import bar iron but exported 31,500 tons.

Iron process innovations
A major change in the iron industries during the Industrial Revolution was the replacement of wood and other bio-fuels with coal. For a given amount of heat, mining coal required much less labour than cutting wood and converting it to charcoal, and coal was much more abundant than wood, supplies of which were becoming scarce before the enormous increase in iron production that took place in the late 18th century.

By 1750 coke had generally replaced charcoal in the smelting of copper and lead and was in widespread use in glass production. In the smelting and refining of iron, coal and coke produced inferior iron to that made with charcoal because of the coal's sulfur content. Low sulfur coals were known, but they still contained harmful amounts. Conversion of coal to coke only slightly reduces the sulfur content. A minority of coals are coking. Another factor limiting the iron industry before the Industrial Revolution was the scarcity of water power to power blast bellows. This limitation was overcome by the steam engine.

Use of coal in iron smelting started somewhat before the Industrial Revolution, based on innovations by Clement Clerke and others from 1678, using coal reverberatory furnaces known as cupolas. These were operated by the flames playing on the ore and charcoal or coke mixture, reducing the oxide to metal. This has the advantage that impurities (such as sulphur ash) in the coal do not migrate into the metal. This technology was applied to lead from 1678 and to copper from 1687. It was also applied to iron foundry work in the 1690s, but in this case the reverberatory furnace was known as an air furnace. (The foundry cupola is a different, and later, innovation.)

By 1709 Abraham Darby made progress using coke to fuel his blast furnaces at Coalbrookdale. However, the coke pig iron he made was not suitable for making wrought iron and was used mostly for the production of cast iron goods, such as pots and kettles. He had the advantage over his rivals in that his pots, cast by his patented process, were thinner and cheaper than theirs.

Coke pig iron was hardly used to produce wrought iron until 1755–56, when Darby's son Abraham Darby II built furnaces at Horsehay and Ketley where low sulfur coal was available (and not far from Coalbrookdale). These furnaces were equipped with water-powered bellows, the water being pumped by Newcomen steam engines. The Newcomen engines were not attached directly to the blowing cylinders because the engines alone could not produce a steady air blast. Abraham Darby III installed similar steam-pumped, water-powered blowing cylinders at the Dale Company when he took control in 1768. The Dale Company used several Newcomen engines to drain its mines and made parts for engines which it sold throughout the country.

Steam engines made the use of higher-pressure and volume blast practical; however, the leather used in bellows was expensive to replace. In 1757, ironmaster John Wilkinson patented a hydraulic powered blowing engine for blast furnaces. The blowing cylinder for blast furnaces was introduced in 1760 and the first blowing cylinder made of cast iron is believed to be the one used at Carrington in 1768 that was designed by John Smeaton.

Cast iron cylinders for use with a piston were difficult to manufacture; the cylinders had to be free of holes and had to be machined smooth and straight to remove any warping.  James Watt had great difficulty trying to have a cylinder made for his first steam engine. In 1774 Wilkinson invented a precision boring machine for boring cylinders. After Wilkinson bored the first successful cylinder for a Boulton and Watt steam engine in 1776, he was given an exclusive contract for providing cylinders. After Watt developed a rotary steam engine in 1782, they were widely applied to blowing, hammering, rolling and slitting.

The solutions to the sulfur problem were the addition of sufficient limestone to the furnace to force sulfur into the slag as well as the use of low sulfur coal. The use of lime or limestone required higher furnace temperatures to form a free-flowing slag. The increased furnace temperature made possible by improved blowing also increased the capacity of blast furnaces and allowed for increased furnace height. In addition to lower cost and greater availability, coke had other important advantages over charcoal in that it was harder and made the column of materials (iron ore, fuel, slag) flowing down the blast furnace more porous and did not crush in the much taller furnaces of the late 19th century.

As cast iron became cheaper and widely available, it began being a structural material for bridges and buildings. A famous early example is the Iron Bridge built in 1778 with cast iron produced by Abraham Darby III. However, most cast iron was converted to wrought iron. Conversion of cast iron had long been done in a finery forge. An improved refining process known as potting and stamping was developed, but this was superseded by Henry Cort's puddling process. Cort developed two significant iron manufacturing processes: rolling in 1783 and puddling in 1784. Puddling produced a structural grade iron at a relatively low cost.

Puddling was a means of decarburizing molten pig iron by slow oxidation in a reverberatory furnace by manually stirring it with a long rod.  The decarburized iron, having a higher melting point than cast iron, was raked into globs by the puddler. When the glob was large enough, the puddler would remove it. Puddling was backbreaking and extremely hot work. Few puddlers lived to be 40. Because puddling was done in a reverberatory furnace, coal or coke could be used as fuel. The puddling process continued to be used until the late 19th century when iron was being displaced by steel. Because puddling required human skill in sensing the iron globs, it was never successfully mechanised. Rolling was an important part of the puddling process because the grooved rollers expelled most of the molten slag and consolidated the mass of hot wrought iron. Rolling was 15 times faster at this than a trip hammer. A different use of rolling, which was done at lower temperatures than that for expelling slag, was in the production of iron sheets, and later structural shapes such as beams, angles, and rails.

The puddling process was improved in 1818 by Baldwyn Rogers, who replaced some of the sand lining on the reverberatory furnace bottom with iron oxide. In 1838 John Hall patented the use of roasted tap cinder (iron silicate) for the furnace bottom, greatly reducing the loss of iron through increased slag caused by a sand lined bottom. The tap cinder also tied up some phosphorus, but this was not understood at the time. Hall's process also used iron scale or rust which reacted with carbon in the molten iron. Hall's process, called wet puddling, reduced losses of iron with the slag from almost 50% to around 8%.

Puddling became widely used after 1800. Up to that time, British iron manufacturers had used considerable amounts of iron imported from Sweden and Russia to supplement domestic supplies. Because of the increased British production, imports began to decline in 1785, and by the 1790s Britain eliminated imports and became a net exporter of bar iron.

Hot blast, patented by the Scottish inventor James Beaumont Neilson in 1828, was the most important development of the 19th century for saving energy in making pig iron. By using preheated combustion air, the amount of fuel to make a unit of pig iron was reduced at first by between one-third using coke or two-thirds using coal; the efficiency gains continued as the technology improved. Hot blast also raised the operating temperature of furnaces, increasing their capacity. Using less coal or coke meant introducing fewer impurities into the pig iron. This meant that lower quality coal could be used in areas where coking coal was unavailable or too expensive; however, by the end of the 19th century transportation costs fell considerably.

Shortly before the Industrial Revolution, an improvement was made in the production of steel, which was an expensive commodity and used only where iron would not do, such as for cutting edge tools and for springs. Benjamin Huntsman developed his crucible steel technique in the 1740s. The raw material for this was blister steel, made by the cementation process. The supply of cheaper iron and steel aided a number of industries, such as those making nails, hinges, wire, and other hardware items. The development of machine tools allowed better working of iron, causing it to be increasingly used in the rapidly growing machinery and engine industries.

Steam power

The development of the stationary steam engine was an important element of the Industrial Revolution; however, during the early period of the Industrial Revolution, most industrial power was supplied by water and wind. In Britain, by 1800 an estimated 10,000 horsepower was being supplied by steam. By 1815 steam power had grown to 210,000 hp.

The first commercially successful industrial use of steam power was patented by Thomas Savery in 1698. He constructed in London a low-lift combined vacuum and pressure water pump that generated about one horsepower (hp) and was used in numerous waterworks and in a few mines (hence its "brand name", The Miner's Friend). Savery's pump was economical in small horsepower ranges but was prone to boiler explosions in larger sizes. Savery pumps continued to be produced until the late 18th century.

The first successful piston steam engine was introduced by Thomas Newcomen before 1712. They were also used to power municipal water supply pumps. They were extremely inefficient by modern standards, but when located where coal was cheap at pit heads, they opened up a great expansion in coal mining by allowing mines to go deeper. Despite their disadvantages, Newcomen engines were reliable and easy to maintain and continued to be used in the coalfields until the early decades of the 19th century. By 1729, when Newcomen died, his engines had spread (first) to Hungary in 1722, Germany, Austria, and Sweden. A total of 110 are known to have been built by 1733 when the joint patent expired, of which 14 were abroad. In the 1770s the engineer John Smeaton built some very large examples and introduced a number of improvements. A total of 1,454 engines had been built by 1800.

A fundamental change in working principles was brought about by Scotsman James Watt. With financial support from his business partner Englishman Matthew Boulton, he had succeeded by 1778 in perfecting his steam engine, which incorporated a series of radical improvements, notably the closing off of the upper part of the cylinder thereby making the low-pressure steam drive the top of the piston instead of the atmosphere; use of a steam jacket; and the celebrated separate steam condenser chamber. The separate condenser did away with the cooling water that had been injected directly into the cylinder which cooled the cylinder and wasted steam. Likewise, the steam jacket kept steam from condensing in the cylinder, also improving efficiency. These improvements increased engine efficiency so that Boulton and Watt's engines used only 20–25% as much coal per horsepower-hour as Newcomen's. Boulton and Watt opened the Soho Foundry for the manufacture of such engines in 1795.

By 1783 the Watt steam engine had been fully developed into a double-acting rotative type, which meant that it could be used to directly drive the rotary machinery of a factory or mill.

Until about 1800 the most common pattern of steam engine was the beam engine, built as an integral part of a stone or brick engine-house, but soon various patterns of self-contained rotative engines (readily removable but not on wheels) were developed, such as the table engine. Around the start of the 19th century, at which time the Boulton and Watt patent expired, the Cornish engineer Richard Trevithick and the American Oliver Evans began to construct higher-pressure non-condensing steam engines, exhausting against the atmosphere. High pressure yielded an engine and boiler compact enough to be used on mobile road and rail locomotives and steamboats.

Small industrial power requirements continued to be provided by animal and human muscle until widespread electrification in the early 20th century. These included crank-powered, treadle-powered and horse-powered workshop, and light industrial machinery.

Machine tools

Pre-industrial machinery was built by various craftsmenmillwrights built watermills and windmills; carpenters made wooden framing; and smiths and turners made metal parts. Wooden components had the disadvantage of changing dimensions with temperature and humidity, and the various joints tended to rack (work loose) over time. As the Industrial Revolution progressed, machines with metal parts and frames became more common. Other important uses of metal parts were in firearms and threaded fasteners, such as machine screws, bolts, and nuts. There was also the need for precision in making parts. Precision would allow better working machinery, interchangeability of parts, and standardization of threaded fasteners.

The demand for metal parts led to the development of several machine tools. They have their origins in the tools developed in the 18th century by makers of clocks and watches and scientific instrument makers to enable them to batch-produce small mechanisms. Before the advent of machine tools, metal was worked manually using the basic hand tools of hammers, files, scrapers, saws, and chisels. Consequently, the use of metal machine parts was kept to a minimum. Hand methods of production were laborious and costly, and precision was difficult to achieve.

The first large precision machine tool was the cylinder boring machine invented by John Wilkinson in 1774. It was used for boring the large-diameter cylinders on early steam engines. Wilkinson's boring machine differed from earlier cantilevered machines used for boring cannon in that the cutting tool was mounted on a beam that ran through the cylinder being bored and was supported outside on both ends.

The planing machine, the milling machine and the shaping machine were developed in the early decades of the 19th century. Although the milling machine was invented at this time, it was not developed as a serious workshop tool until somewhat later in the 19th century.

Henry Maudslay, who trained a school of machine tool makers early in the 19th century, was a mechanic with superior ability who had been employed at the Royal Arsenal, Woolwich. He worked as an apprentice at the Royal Arsenal under Jan Verbruggen. In 1774 Verbruggen had installed a horizontal boring machine which was the first industrial size lathe in the UK. Maudslay was hired away by Joseph Bramah for the production of high-security metal locks that required precision craftsmanship. Bramah patented a lathe that had similarities to the slide rest lathe. Maudslay perfected the slide rest lathe, which could cut machine screws of different thread pitches by using changeable gears between the spindle and the lead screw. Before its invention, screws could not be cut to any precision using various earlier lathe designs, some of which copied from a template. The slide rest lathe was called one of history's most important inventions. Although it was not entirely Maudslay's idea, he was the first person to build a functional lathe using a combination of known innovations of the lead screw, slide rest, and change gears.

Maudslay left Bramah's employment and set up his own shop. He was engaged to build the machinery for making ships' pulley blocks for the Royal Navy in the Portsmouth Block Mills. These machines were all-metal and were the first machines for mass production and making components with a degree of interchangeability. The lessons Maudslay learned about the need for stability and precision he adapted to the development of machine tools, and in his workshops, he trained a generation of men to build on his work, such as Richard Roberts, Joseph Clement and Joseph Whitworth.

James Fox of Derby had a healthy export trade in machine tools for the first part of the 19th century, as did Matthew Murray of Leeds. Roberts was a maker of high-quality machine tools and a pioneer of the use of jigs and gauges for precision workshop measurement. The techniques to make mass-produced metal parts made with sufficient precision to be interchangeable is largely attributed to a program of the U.S. Department of War which perfected interchangeable parts for firearms in the early 19th century. In the half-century following the invention of the fundamental machine tools, the machine industry became the largest industrial sector of the U.S. economy, by value added.

Chemicals
The large-scale production of chemicals was an important development during the Industrial Revolution. The first of these was the production of sulphuric acid by the lead chamber process invented by the Englishman John Roebuck (James Watt's first partner) in 1746. He was able to greatly increase the scale of the manufacture by replacing the relatively expensive glass vessels formerly used with larger, less expensive chambers made of riveted sheets of lead.

The production of an alkali on a large scale became an important goal as well, and Nicolas Leblanc succeeded in 1791 in introducing a method for the production of sodium carbonate (soda ash). The Leblanc process was a reaction of sulfuric acid with sodium chloride to give sodium sulfate and hydrochloric acid. The sodium sulfate was heated with calcium carbonate and coal to give a mixture of sodium carbonate and calcium sulfide. Adding water separated the soluble sodium carbonate from the calcium sulfide. The process produced a large amount of pollution (the hydrochloric acid was initially vented to the atmosphere, and calcium sulfide was a waste product). Nonetheless, this synthetic soda ash proved economical compared to that produced from burning specific plants (barilla or kelp), which were the previously dominant sources of soda ash, and also to potash (potassium carbonate) produced from hardwood ashes. These two chemicals were very important because they enabled the introduction of a host of other inventions, replacing many small-scale operations with more cost-effective and controllable processes. Sodium carbonate had many uses in the glass, textile, soap, and paper industries. Early uses for sulfuric acid included pickling (removing rust from) iron and steel, and for bleaching cloth.

The development of bleaching powder (calcium hypochlorite) by Scottish chemist Charles Tennant in about 1800, based on the discoveries of French chemist Claude Louis Berthollet, revolutionised the bleaching processes in the textile industry by dramatically reducing the time required (from months to days) for the traditional process then in use, which required repeated exposure to the sun in bleach fields after soaking the textiles with alkali or sour milk. Tennant's factory at St Rollox, Glasgow, became the largest chemical plant in the world.

After 1860 the focus on chemical innovation was in dyestuffs, and Germany took world leadership, building a strong chemical industry. Aspiring chemists flocked to German universities in the 1860–1914 era to learn the latest techniques. British scientists by contrast, lacked research universities and did not train advanced students; instead, the practice was to hire German-trained chemists.<ref>Johann P. Murmann, Knowledge and competitive advantage: the co-evolution of firms, technology, and national institutions (2003) pp. 53–54</ref>

Concrete

In 1824 Joseph Aspdin, a British bricklayer turned builder, patented a chemical process for making portland cement which was an important advance in the building trades. Portland cement concrete was used by the English engineer Marc Isambard Brunel several years later when constructing the Thames Tunnel. Concrete was used on a large scale in the construction of the London sewer system a generation later.

Gas lighting
Though others made a similar innovation elsewhere, the large-scale introduction of gas lighting was the work of William Murdoch, an employee of Boulton & Watt. The process consisted of the large-scale gasification of coal in furnaces, the purification of the gas (removal of sulphur, ammonia, and heavy hydrocarbons), and its storage and distribution. The first gas lighting utilities were established in London between 1812 and 1820. They soon became one of the major consumers of coal in the UK. Gas lighting affected social and industrial organisation because it allowed factories and stores to remain open longer than with tallow candles or oil lamps. Its introduction allowed nightlife to flourish in cities and towns as interiors and streets could be lighted on a larger scale than before.

Glass making

Glass was made in ancient Greece and Rome. A new method of glass production, known as the cylinder process, was developed in Europe during the early 19th century. In 1832 this process was used by the Chance Brothers to create sheet glass. They became the leading producers of window and plate glass. This advancement allowed for larger panes of glass to be created without interruption, thus freeing up the space planning in interiors as well as the fenestration of buildings. The Crystal Palace is the supreme example of the use of sheet glass in a new and innovative structure.

Paper machine
A machine for making a continuous sheet of paper on a loop of wire fabric was patented in 1798 by Louis-Nicolas Robert in France. The paper machine is known as a Fourdrinier after the financiers, brothers Sealy and Henry Fourdrinier, who were stationers in London. Although greatly improved and with many variations, the Fourdrinier machine is the predominant means of paper production today. The method of continuous production demonstrated by the paper machine influenced the development of continuous rolling of iron and later steel and other continuous production processes.

Agriculture
The British Agricultural Revolution is considered one of the causes of the Industrial Revolution because improved agricultural productivity freed up workers to work in other sectors of the economy. In contrast, per-capita food supply in Europe was stagnant or declining and did not improve in some parts of Europe until the late 18th century.

The English lawyer Jethro Tull invented an improved seed drill in 1701. It was a mechanical seeder that distributed seeds evenly across a plot of land and planted them at the correct depth. This was important because the yield of seeds harvested to seeds planted at that time was around four or five. Tull's seed drill was very expensive and not very reliable and therefore did not have much of an effect. Good quality seed drills were not produced until the mid 18th century.

Joseph Foljambe's Rotherham plough of 1730 was the first commercially successful iron plough. The threshing machine, invented by the Scottish engineer Andrew Meikle in 1784, displaced hand threshing with a flail, a laborious job that took about one-quarter of agricultural labour. Lower labor requirements subsequently result in lowered wages and numbers of farm labourers, who faced near starvation, leading to the 1830 agricultural rebellion of the Swing Riots.

Machine tools and metalworking techniques developed during the Industrial Revolution eventually resulted in precision manufacturing techniques in the late 19th century for mass-producing agricultural equipment, such as reapers, binders, and combine harvesters.

Mining
Coal mining in Britain, particularly in South Wales, started early. Before the steam engine, pits were often shallow bell pits following a seam of coal along the surface, which were abandoned as the coal was extracted. In other cases, if the geology was favourable the coal was mined by means of an adit or drift mine driven into the side of a hill. Shaft mining was done in some areas, but the limiting factor was the problem of removing water. It could be done by hauling buckets of water up the shaft or to a sough (a tunnel driven into a hill to drain a mine). In either case, the water had to be discharged into a stream or ditch at a level where it could flow away by gravity.

The introduction of the steam pump by Thomas Savery in 1698 and the Newcomen steam engine in 1712 greatly facilitated the removal of water and enabled shafts to be made deeper, enabling more coal to be extracted. These were developments that had begun before the Industrial Revolution, but the adoption of John Smeaton's improvements to the Newcomen engine followed by James Watt's more efficient steam engines from the 1770s reduced the fuel costs of engines, making mines more profitable.  The Cornish engine, developed in the 1810s, was much more efficient than the Watt steam engine.

Coal mining was very dangerous owing to the presence of firedamp in many coal seams. Some degree of safety was provided by the safety lamp which was invented in 1816 by Sir Humphry Davy and independently by George Stephenson. However, the lamps proved a false dawn because they became unsafe very quickly and provided a weak light. Firedamp explosions continued, often setting off coal dust explosions, so casualties grew during the entire 19th century. Conditions of work were very poor, with a high casualty rate from rock falls.

Transportation

At the beginning of the Industrial Revolution, inland transport was by navigable rivers and roads, with coastal vessels employed to move heavy goods by sea. Wagonways were used for conveying coal to rivers for further shipment, but canals had not yet been widely constructed. Animals supplied all of the motive power on land, with sails providing the motive power on the sea. The first horse railways were introduced toward the end of the 18th century, with steam locomotives being introduced in the early decades of the 19th century. Improving sailing technologies boosted average sailing speed by 50% between 1750 and 1830.

The Industrial Revolution improved Britain's transport infrastructure with a turnpike road network, a canal and waterway network, and a railway network. Raw materials and finished products could be moved more quickly and cheaply than before. Improved transportation also allowed new ideas to spread quickly.

Canals and improved waterways

Before and during the Industrial Revolution navigation on several British rivers was improved by removing obstructions, straightening curves, widening and deepening, and building navigation locks. Canals and waterways allowed bulk materials to be economically transported long distances inland. This was because a horse could pull a barge with a load dozens of times larger than the load that could be drawn in a cart.

Canals began to be built in the UK in the late 18th century to link the major manufacturing centres across the country. Known for its huge commercial success, the Bridgewater Canal in North West England, which opened in 1761 and was mostly funded by The 3rd Duke of Bridgewater.  From Worsley to the rapidly growing town of Manchester its construction cost £168,000 (£ ), but its advantages over land and river transport meant that within a year of its opening in 1761, the price of coal in Manchester fell by about half. This success helped inspire a period of intense canal building, known as Canal Mania. Canals were hastily built with the aim of replicating the commercial success of the Bridgewater Canal, the most notable being the Leeds and Liverpool Canal and the Thames and Severn Canal which opened in 1774 and 1789 respectively.

By the 1820s a national network was in existence. Canal construction served as a model for the organisation and methods later used to construct the railways. They were eventually largely superseded as profitable commercial enterprises by the spread of the railways from the 1840s on. The last major canal to be built in the United Kingdom was the Manchester Ship Canal, which upon opening in 1894 was the largest ship canal in the world, and opened Manchester as a port. However, it never achieved the commercial success its sponsors had hoped for and signalled canals as a dying mode of transport in an age dominated by railways, which were quicker and often cheaper.

Britain's canal network, together with its surviving mill buildings, is one of the most enduring features of the early Industrial Revolution to be seen in Britain.

Roads

France was known for having an excellent system of roads at the time of the Industrial Revolution; however, most of the roads on the European continent and in the UK were in bad condition and dangerously rutted."There exist everywhere roads suitable for hauling".Robert Fulton on roads in France Much of the original British road system was poorly maintained by thousands of local parishes, but from the 1720s (and occasionally earlier) turnpike trusts were set up to charge tolls and maintain some roads. Increasing numbers of main roads were turnpiked from the 1750s to the extent that almost every main road in England and Wales was the responsibility of a turnpike trust. New engineered roads were built by John Metcalf, Thomas Telford and most notably John McAdam, with the first 'macadam' stretch of road being Marsh Road at Ashton Gate, Bristol in 1816. The first macadam road in the U.S. was the "Boonsborough Turnpike Road" between Hagerstown and Boonsboro, Maryland in 1823.

The major turnpikes radiated from London and were the means by which the Royal Mail was able to reach the rest of the country. Heavy goods transport on these roads was by means of slow, broad-wheeled carts hauled by teams of horses. Lighter goods were conveyed by smaller carts or by teams of packhorse. Stagecoaches carried the rich, and the less wealthy could pay to ride on carriers carts. Productivity of road transport increased greatly during the Industrial Revolution, and the cost of travel fell dramatically. Between 1690 and 1840 productivity almost tripled for long-distance carrying and increased four-fold in stage coaching.

Railways

Railways were made practical by the widespread introduction of inexpensive puddled iron after 1800, the rolling mill for making rails, and the development of the high-pressure steam engine also around 1800. Reducing friction was one of the major reasons for the success of railroads compared to wagons. This was demonstrated on an iron plate-covered wooden tramway in 1805 at Croydon, England.
A good horse on an ordinary turnpike road can draw two thousand pounds, or one ton. A party of gentlemen were invited to witness the experiment, that the superiority of the new road might be established by ocular demonstration. Twelve wagons were loaded with stones, till each wagon weighed three tons, and the wagons were fastened together. A horse was then attached, which drew the wagons with ease,  in two hours, having stopped four times, in order to show he had the power of starting, as well as drawing his great load.

Wagonways for moving coal in the mining areas had started in the 17th century and were often associated with canal or river systems for the further movement of coal. These were all horse-drawn or relied on gravity, with a stationary steam engine to haul the wagons back to the top of the incline. The first applications of the steam locomotive were on wagon or plate ways (as they were then often called from the cast-iron plates used). Horse-drawn public railways begin in the early 19th century when improvements to pig and wrought iron production were lowering costs.

Steam locomotives began being built after the introduction of high-pressure steam engines after the expiration of the Boulton and Watt patent in 1800. High-pressure engines exhausted used steam to the atmosphere, doing away with the condenser and cooling water. They were also much lighter weight and smaller in size for a given horsepower than the stationary condensing engines. A few of these early locomotives were used in mines. Steam-hauled public railways began with the Stockton and Darlington Railway in 1825.

The rapid introduction of railways followed the 1829 Rainhill trials, which demonstrated Robert Stephenson's successful locomotive design and the 1828 development of hot blast, which dramatically reduced the fuel consumption of making iron and increased the capacity of the blast furnace. On 15 September 1830, the Liverpool and Manchester Railway, the first inter-city railway in the world, was opened and was attended by Prime Minister Arthur Wellesley. The railway was engineered by Joseph Locke and George Stephenson, linked the rapidly expanding industrial town of Manchester with the port town of Liverpool. The opening was marred by problems caused by the primitive nature of the technology being employed; however, problems were gradually solved, and the railway became highly successful, transporting passengers and freight. 

The success of the inter-city railway, particularly in the transport of freight and commodities, led to Railway Mania. Construction of major railways connecting the larger cities and towns began in the 1830s but only gained momentum at the very end of the first Industrial Revolution. After many of the workers had completed the railways, they did not return to their rural lifestyles but instead remained in the cities, providing additional workers for the factories.

Social effects

Factory system

Prior to the Industrial Revolution, most of the workforce was employed in agriculture, either as self-employed farmers as landowners or tenants or as landless agricultural labourers. It was common for families in various parts of the world to spin yarn, weave cloth and make their own clothing. Households also spun and wove for market production.  At the beginning of the Industrial Revolution, India, China, and regions of Iraq and elsewhere in Asia and the Middle East produced most of the world's cotton cloth while Europeans produced wool and linen goods.

In Britain by the 16th century the putting-out system was practised, by which farmers and townspeople produced goods for a market in their homes, often described as cottage industry. Typical putting-out system goods included spinning and weaving. Merchant capitalists typically provided the raw materials, paid workers by the by the piece, and were responsible for the sale of the goods. Embezzlement of supplies by workers and poor quality were common problems. The logistical effort in procuring and distributing raw materials and picking up finished goods were also limitations of the putting-out system.

Some early spinning and weaving machinery, such as a 40 spindle jenny for about six pounds in 1792, was affordable for cottagers. Later machinery such as spinning frames, spinning mules and power looms were expensive (especially if water-powered), giving rise to capitalist ownership of factories.

The majority of textile factory workers during the Industrial Revolution were unmarried women and children, including many orphans. They typically worked for 12 to 14 hours per day with only Sundays off. It was common for women to take factory jobs seasonally during slack periods of farm work. Lack of adequate transportation, long hours, and poor pay made it difficult to recruit and maintain workers. Many workers, such as displaced farmers and agricultural workers, who had nothing but their labour to sell, became factory workers out of necessity.

The change in the social relationship of the factory worker compared to farmers and cottagers was viewed unfavourably by Karl Marx; however, he recognized the increase in productivity made possible by technology.

Standards of living
Some economists, such as Robert Lucas Jr., say that the real effect of the Industrial Revolution was that "for the first time in history, the living standards of the masses of ordinary people have begun to undergo sustained growth ... Nothing remotely like this economic behaviour is mentioned by the classical economists, even as a theoretical possibility." Others argue that while the growth of the economy's overall productive powers was unprecedented during the Industrial Revolution, living standards for the majority of the population did not grow meaningfully until the late 19th and 20th centuries and that in many ways workers' living standards declined under early capitalism: for instance, studies have shown that real wages in Britain only increased 15% between the 1780s and 1850s and that life expectancy in Britain did not begin to dramatically increase until the 1870s. Similarly, the average height of the population declined during the Industrial Revolution, implying that their nutritional status was also decreasing. Real wages were not keeping up with the price of food.

During the Industrial Revolution, the life expectancy of children increased dramatically. The percentage of the children born in London who died before the age of five decreased from 74.5% in 1730–1749 to 31.8% in 1810–1829. The effects on living conditions have been controversial and were hotly debated by economic and social historians from the 1950s to the 1980s. A series of 1950s essays by Henry Phelps Brown and Sheila V. Hopkins later set the academic consensus that the bulk of the population, that was at the bottom of the social ladder, suffered severe reductions in their living standards. During 1813–1913, there was a significant increase in worker wages.

Food and nutrition

Chronic hunger and malnutrition were the norms for the majority of the population of the world including Britain and France until the late 19th century. Until about 1750, malnutrition limited life expectancy in France to about 35 years and about 40 years in Britain. The United States population of the time was adequately fed, much taller on average, and had a life expectancy of 45–50 years, although U.S. life expectancy declined by a few years by the mid 19th century. Food consumption per capita also declined during an episode known as the Antebellum Puzzle.

Food supply in Great Britain was adversely affected by the Corn Laws (1815–1846) which imposed tariffs on imported grain. The laws were enacted to keep prices high in order to benefit domestic producers. The Corn Laws were repealed in the early years of the Great Irish Famine.

The initial technologies of the Industrial Revolution, such as mechanized textiles, iron and coal, did little, if anything, to lower food prices. In Britain and the Netherlands, food supply increased before the Industrial Revolution with better agricultural practices; however, population grew as well. This condition is called the Malthusian trap, and it finally started to be overcome by transportation improvements, such as canals, improved roads and steamships. Railroads and steamships were introduced near the end of the Industrial Revolution.

Housing

The rapid population growth in the 19th century included the new industrial and manufacturing cities, as well as service centers such as Edinburgh and London. The critical factor was financing, which was handled by building societies that dealt directly with large contracting firms.Christopher Powell, The British building industry since 1800: An economic history (Taylor & Francis, 1996). Private renting from housing landlords was the dominant tenure. P. Kemp says this was usually of advantage to tenants. People moved in so rapidly there was not enough capital to build adequate housing for everyone, so low-income newcomers squeezed into increasingly overcrowded slums. Clean water, sanitation, and public health facilities were inadequate; the death rate was high, especially infant mortality, and tuberculosis among young adults. Cholera from polluted water and typhoid were endemic. Unlike rural areas, there were no famines such as the one that devastated Ireland in the 1840s.Anthony S. Wohl, The eternal slum: housing and social policy in Victorian London (1977).

A large exposé literature grew up condemning the unhealthy conditions. By far the most famous publication was by one of the founders of the socialist movement, The Condition of the Working Class in England in 1844 Friedrich Engels describes backstreet sections of Manchester and other mill towns, where people lived in crude shanties and shacks, some not completely enclosed, some with dirt floors. These shanty towns had narrow walkways between irregularly shaped lots and dwellings.  There were no sanitary facilities. The population density was extremely high. However, not everyone lived in such poor conditions. The Industrial Revolution also created a middle class of businessmen, clerks, foremen, and engineers who lived in much better conditions.

Conditions improved over the course of the 19th century with new public health acts regulating things such as sewage, hygiene, and home construction. In the introduction of his 1892 edition, Engels notes that most of the conditions he wrote about in 1844 had been greatly improved. For example, the Public Health Act 1875 led to the more sanitary byelaw terraced house.

Water and sanitation
Pre-industrial water supply relied on gravity systems, and pumping of water was done by water wheels. Pipes were typically made of wood. Steam-powered pumps and iron pipes allowed the widespread piping of water to horse watering troughs and households.

Engels' book describes how untreated sewage created awful odours and turned the rivers green in industrial cities. In 1854 John Snow traced a cholera outbreak in Soho in London to fecal contamination of a public water well by a home cesspit. Snow's findings that cholera could be spread by contaminated water took some years to be accepted, but his work led to fundamental changes in the design of public water and waste systems.

Literacy

In the 18th century, there were relatively high levels of literacy among farmers in England and Scotland. This permitted the recruitment of literate craftsmen, skilled workers, foremen, and managers who supervised the emerging textile factories and coal mines. Much of the labour was unskilled, and especially in textile mills children as young as eight proved useful in handling chores and adding to the family income. Indeed, children were taken out of school to work alongside their parents in the factories. However, by the mid-19th century, unskilled labor forces were common in Western Europe, and British industry moved upscale, needing many more engineers and skilled workers who could handle technical instructions and handle complex situations. Literacy was essential to be hired.Robert Allan Houston,  "The Development of Literacy: Northern England, 1640–1750." Economic History Review (1982) 35#2: 199–216 online. A senior government official told Parliament in 1870:
Upon the speedy provision of elementary education depends are industrial prosperity. It is of no use trying to give technical teaching to our citizens without elementary education; uneducated labourers—and many of our labourers are utterly uneducated—are, for the most part, unskilled labourers, and if we leave our work–folk any longer unskilled, notwithstanding their strong sinews and determined energy, they will become overmatched in the competition of the world.

The invention of the paper machine and the application of steam power to the industrial processes of printing supported a massive expansion of newspaper and pamphlet publishing, which contributed to rising literacy and demands for mass political participation.

Clothing and consumer goods

Consumers benefited from falling prices for clothing and household articles such as cast iron cooking utensils, and in the following decades, stoves for cooking and space heating. Coffee, tea, sugar, tobacco, and chocolate became affordable to many in Europe. The consumer revolution in England from the early 17th century to the mid-18th century had seen a marked increase in the consumption and variety of luxury goods and products by individuals from different economic and social backgrounds. With improvements in transport and manufacturing technology, opportunities for buying and selling became faster and more efficient than previous. The expanding textile trade in the north of England meant the three-piece suit became affordable to the masses. Founded by Josiah Wedgwood in 1759, Wedgwood fine china and porcelain tableware was starting to become a common feature on dining tables. Rising prosperity and social mobility in the 18th century increased the number of people with disposable income for consumption, and the marketing of goods (of which Wedgwood was a pioneer) for individuals, as opposed to items for the household, started to appear, and the new status of goods as status symbols related to changes in fashion and desired for aesthetic appeal.

New businesses in various industries appeared in towns and cities throughout Britain. Confectionery was one such industry that saw rapid expansion. According to food historian Polly Russell: "chocolate and biscuits became products for the masses, thanks to the Industrial Revolution and the consumers it created. By the mid-19th century, sweet biscuits were an affordable indulgence and business was booming. Manufacturers such as Huntley & Palmers in Reading, Carr's of Carlisle and McVitie's in Edinburgh transformed from small family-run businesses into state-of-the-art operations". In 1847 Fry's of Bristol produced the first chocolate bar. Their competitor Cadbury of Birmingham was the first to commercialize the association between confectionery and romance when they produced a heart-shaped box of chocolates for Valentine's Day in 1868. The department store became a common feature in major High Streets across Britain; one of the first was opened in 1796 by Harding, Howell & Co. on Pall Mall in London. In addition to goods being sold in the growing number of stores, street sellers were common in an increasingly urbanized country. Dr Matthew White: "Crowds swarmed in every thoroughfare. Scores of street sellers ‘cried’ merchandise from place to place, advertising the wealth of goods and services on offer. Milkmaids, orange sellers, fishwives and piemen, for example, all walked the streets offering their various wares for sale, while knife grinders and the menders of broken chairs and furniture could be found on street corners". An early soft drinks company, R. White's Lemonade, began in 1845 by selling drinks in London in a wheelbarrow.

Increased literacy rates, industrialisation, and the invention of the railway created a new market for cheap popular literature for the masses and the ability for it to be circulated on a large scale. Penny dreadfuls were created in the 1830s to meet this demand. The Guardian described penny dreadfuls as "Britain's first taste of mass-produced popular culture for the young", and "the Victorian equivalent of video games". By the 1860s and 1870s more than one million boys' periodicals were sold per week. Labelled an "authorpreneur" by The Paris Review, Charles Dickens used innovations from the revolution to sell his books, such as the powerful new printing presses, enhanced advertising revenues, and the expansion of railroads. His first novel, The Pickwick Papers (1836), became a publishing phenomenon with its unprecedented success sparking numerous spin-offs and merchandise ranging from Pickwick cigars, playing cards, china figurines, Sam Weller puzzles, Weller boot polish and joke books. Nicholas Dames in The Atlantic writes, “Literature” is not a big enough category for Pickwick. It defined its own, a new one that we have learned to call “entertainment.”

In 1861, Welsh entrepreneur Pryce Pryce-Jones formed the first mail order business, an idea which would change the nature of retail. Selling Welsh flannel, he created mail order catalogues, with customers able to order by mail for the first timethis following the Uniform Penny Post in 1840 and the invention of the postage stamp (Penny Black) where there was a charge of one penny for carriage and delivery between any two places in the United Kingdom irrespective of distanceand the goods were delivered throughout the UK via the newly created railway system. As the railway network expanded overseas, so did his business.

Population increase
The Industrial Revolution was the first period in history during which there was a simultaneous increase in both population and per capita income. According to Robert Hughes in The Fatal Shore, the population of England and Wales, which had remained steady at six million from 1700 to 1740, rose dramatically after 1740. The population of England had more than doubled from 8.3 million in 1801 to 16.8 million in 1850 and, by 1901, had nearly doubled again to 30.5 million. Improved conditions led to the population of Britain increasing from 10 million to 30 million in the 19th century. Europe's population increased from about 100 million in 1700 to 400 million by 1900.

Urbanization

The growth of the modern industry since the late 18th century led to massive urbanisation and the rise of new great cities, first in Europe and then in other regions, as new opportunities brought huge numbers of migrants from rural communities into urban areas.  In 1800, only 3% of the world's population lived in cities, compared to nearly 50% by the beginning of the 21st century. Manchester had a population of 10,000 in 1717, but by 1911 it had burgeoned to 2.3 million.

Effect on women and family life
Women's historians have debated the effect of the Industrial Revolution and capitalism generally on the status of women. Taking a pessimistic side, Alice Clark argues that when capitalism arrived in 17th-century England, it lowered the status of women as they lost much of their economic importance. Clark argues that in 16th-century England, women were engaged in many aspects of industry and agriculture. The home was a central unit of production, and women played a vital role in running farms and in some trades and landed estates. Their useful economic roles gave them a sort of equality with their husbands. However, Clark argues, as capitalism expanded in the 17th century, there was more division of labour with the husband taking paid labour jobs outside the home, and the wife was reduced to unpaid household work. Middle- and upper-class women were confined to an idle domestic existence, supervising servants; lower-class women were forced to take poorly paid jobs. Capitalism, therefore, had a negative effect on powerful women.

In a more positive interpretation, Ivy Pinchbeck argues that capitalism created the conditions for women's emancipation. Tilly and Scott have emphasised the continuity in the status of women, finding three stages in English history. In the pre-industrial era, production was mostly for home use, and women produced much of the needs of the households. The second stage was the "family wage economy" of early industrialisation; the entire family depended on the collective wages of its members, including husband, wife, and older children. The third or modern stage is the "family consumer economy," in which the family is the site of consumption, and women are employed in large numbers in retail and clerical jobs to support rising standards of consumption.

Ideas of thrift and hard work characterized middle-class families as the Industrial Revolution swept Europe. These values were displayed in Samuel Smiles' book Self-Help, in which he states that the misery of the poorer classes was "voluntary and self-imposed—the results of idleness, thriftlessness, intemperance, and misconduct."

Labour conditions

Social structure and working conditions
In terms of social structure, the Industrial Revolution witnessed the triumph of a middle class of industrialists and businessmen over a landed class of nobility and gentry. Ordinary working people found increased opportunities for employment in mills and factories, but these were often under strict working conditions with long hours of labour dominated by a pace set by machines. As late as 1900, most industrial workers in the United States worked a 10-hour day (12 hours in the steel industry), yet earned from 20% to 40% less than the minimum deemed necessary for a decent life; however, most workers in textiles, which was by far the leading industry in terms of employment, were women and children. For workers of the labouring classes, industrial life "was a stony desert, which they had to make habitable by their own efforts." 

Harsh working conditions were prevalent long before the Industrial Revolution took place. Pre-industrial society was very static and often cruel—child labour, dirty living conditions, and long working hours were just as prevalent before the Industrial Revolution.

Factories and urbanisation

Industrialisation led to the creation of the factory. The factory system contributed to the growth of urban areas as large numbers of workers migrated into the cities in search of work in the factories. Nowhere was this better illustrated than the mills and associated industries of Manchester, nicknamed "Cottonopolis", and the world's first industrial city. Manchester experienced a six-times increase in its population between 1771 and 1831. Bradford grew by 50% every ten years between 1811 and 1851, and by 1851 only 50% of the population of Bradford were actually born there.

In addition, between 1815 and 1939, 20% of Europe's population left home, pushed by poverty, a rapidly growing population, and the displacement of peasant farming and artisan manufacturing. They were pulled abroad by the enormous demand for labour overseas, the ready availability of land, and cheap transportation. Still, many did not find a satisfactory life in their new homes, leading 7 million of them to return to Europe. This mass migration had large demographic effects: in 1800, less than 1% of the world population consisted of overseas Europeans and their descendants; by 1930, they represented 11%. The Americas felt the brunt of this huge emigration, largely concentrated in the United States.

For much of the 19th century, production was done in small mills which were typically water-powered and built to serve local needs. Later, each factory would have its own steam engine and a chimney to give an efficient draft through its boiler.

In other industries, the transition to factory production was not so divisive. Some industrialists tried to improve factory and living conditions for their workers. One of the earliest such reformers was Robert Owen, known for his pioneering efforts in improving conditions for workers at the New Lanark mills and often regarded as one of the key thinkers of the early socialist movement.

By 1746 an integrated brass mill was working at Warmley near Bristol. Raw material went in at one end, was smelted into brass and was turned into pans, pins, wire, and other goods. Housing was provided for workers on site. Josiah Wedgwood and Matthew Boulton (whose Soho Manufactory was completed in 1766) were other prominent early industrialists who employed the factory system.

Child labour

The Industrial Revolution led to a population increase, but the chances of surviving childhood did not improve throughout the Industrial Revolution, although infant mortality rates were reduced markedly. There was still limited opportunity for education, and children were expected to work. Employers could pay a child less than an adult even though their productivity was comparable; there was no need for strength to operate an industrial machine, and since the industrial system was new, there were no experienced adult labourers. This made child labour the labour of choice for manufacturing in the early phases of the Industrial Revolution between the 18th and 19th centuries. In England and Scotland in 1788, two-thirds of the workers in 143 water-powered cotton mills were described as children.

Child labour existed before the Industrial Revolution, but with the increase in population and education it became more visible. Many children were forced to work in relatively bad conditions for much lower pay than their elders, 10–20% of an adult male's wage.

Reports were written detailing some of the abuses, particularly in the coal mines and textile factories, and these helped to popularise the children's plight. The public outcry, especially among the upper and middle classes, helped stir change in the young workers' welfare.

Politicians and the government tried to limit child labour by law, but factory owners resisted; some felt that they were aiding the poor by giving their children money to buy food to avoid starvation, and others simply welcomed the cheap labour. In 1833 and 1844, the first general laws against child labour, the Factory Acts, were passed in Britain: children younger than nine were not allowed to work, children were not permitted to work at night, and the workday of youth under age 18 was limited to twelve hours. Factory inspectors supervised the execution of the law; however, their scarcity made enforcement difficult. About ten years later, the employment of children and women in mining was forbidden. Although laws such as these decreased the number of child labourers, child labour remained significantly present in Europe and the United States until the 20th century.

Organisation of labour

The Industrial Revolution concentrated labour into mills, factories, and mines, thus facilitating the organisation of combinations or trade unions to help advance the interests of working people. The power of a union could demand better terms by withdrawing all labour and causing a consequent cessation of production. Employers had to decide between giving in to the union demands at a cost to themselves or suffering the cost of the lost production. Skilled workers were difficult to replace, and these were the first groups to successfully advance their conditions through this kind of bargaining.

The main method the unions used to effect change was strike action. Many strikes were painful events for both sides, the unions and the management. In Britain, the Combination Act 1799 forbade workers to form any kind of trade union until its repeal in 1824. Even after this, unions were still severely restricted. One British newspaper in 1834 described unions as "the most dangerous institutions that were ever permitted to take root, under shelter of law, in any country..."

In 1832, the Reform Act extended the vote in Britain but did not grant universal suffrage. That year six men from Tolpuddle in Dorset founded the Friendly Society of Agricultural Labourers to protest against the gradual lowering of wages in the 1830s. They refused to work for less than ten shillings per week, although by this time wages had been reduced to seven shillings per week and were due to be further reduced to six. In 1834 James Frampton, a local landowner, wrote to Prime Minister Lord Melbourne to complain about the union, invoking an obscure law from 1797 prohibiting people from swearing oaths to each other, which the members of the Friendly Society had done. Six men were arrested, found guilty, and transported to Australia. They became known as the Tolpuddle Martyrs. In the 1830s and 1840s, the chartist movement was the first large-scale organised working-class political movement that campaigned for political equality and social justice. Its Charter of reforms received over three million signatures but was rejected by Parliament without consideration.

Working people also formed friendly societies and cooperative societies as mutual support groups against times of economic hardship. Enlightened industrialists, such as Robert Owen supported these organisations to improve the conditions of the working class. Unions slowly overcame the legal restrictions on the right to strike. In 1842, a general strike involving cotton workers and colliers was organised through the chartist movement which stopped production across Great Britain. Eventually, effective political organisation for working people was achieved through the trades unions who, after the extensions of the franchise in 1867 and 1885, began to support socialist political parties that later merged to become the British Labour Party.

Luddites

The rapid industrialisation of the English economy cost many craft workers their jobs. The movement started first with lace and hosiery workers near Nottingham and spread to other areas of the textile industry. Many weavers also found themselves suddenly unemployed since they could no longer compete with machines which only required relatively limited (and unskilled) labour to produce more cloth than a single weaver. Many such unemployed workers, weavers, and others turned their animosity towards the machines that had taken their jobs and began destroying factories and machinery. These attackers became known as Luddites, supposedly followers of Ned Ludd, a folklore figure. The first attacks of the Luddite movement began in 1811. The Luddites rapidly gained popularity, and the British government took drastic measures using the militia or army to protect industry. Those rioters who were caught were tried and hanged, or transported for life.

Unrest continued in other sectors as they industrialised, such as with agricultural labourers in the 1830s when large parts of southern Britain were affected by the Captain Swing disturbances. Threshing machines were a particular target, and hayrick burning was a popular activity. However, the riots led to the first formation of trade unions and further pressure for reform.

Shift in production's center of gravity
The traditional centers of hand textile production such as India, parts of the Middle East, and later China could not withstand the competition from machine-made textiles, which over a period of decades destroyed the hand made textile industries and left millions of people without work, many of whom starved.

The Industrial Revolution generated an enormous and unprecedented economic division in the world, as measured by the share of manufacturing output.

Cotton and the expansion of slavery
Cheap cotton textiles increased the demand for raw cotton; previously, it had primarily been consumed in subtropical regions where it was grown, with little raw cotton available for export. Consequently, prices of raw cotton rose. British production grew from 2 million pounds in 1700 to 5 million pounds in 1781 to 56 million in 1800. The invention of the cotton gin by American Eli Whitney in 1792 was the decisive event. It allowed green-seeded cotton to become profitable, leading to the widespread growth of the large slave plantation in the United States, Brazil, and the West Indies. In 1791 American cotton production was about 2 million pounds, soaring to 35 million by 1800, half of which was exported. America's cotton plantations were highly efficient and profitable and were able to keep up with demand. The U.S. Civil War created a "cotton famine" that led to increased production in other areas of the world, including European colonies in Africa.

Effect on environment

The origins of the environmental movement lay in the response to increasing levels of smoke pollution in the atmosphere during the Industrial Revolution. The emergence of great factories and the concomitant immense growth in coal consumption gave rise to an unprecedented level of air pollution in industrial centers; after 1900 the large volume of industrial chemical discharges added to the growing load of untreated human waste. The first large-scale, modern environmental laws came in the form of Britain's Alkali Acts, passed in 1863, to regulate the deleterious air pollution (gaseous hydrochloric acid) given off by the Leblanc process used to produce soda ash. An alkali inspector and four sub-inspectors were appointed to curb this pollution. The responsibilities of the inspectorate were gradually expanded, culminating in the Alkali Order 1958 which placed all major heavy industries that emitted smoke, grit, dust, and fumes under supervision.

The manufactured gas industry began in British cities in 1812–1820. The technique used produced highly toxic effluent that was dumped into sewers and rivers. The gas companies were repeatedly sued in nuisance lawsuits. They usually lost and modified the worst practices. The City of London repeatedly indicted gas companies in the 1820s for polluting the Thames and poisoning its fish. Finally, Parliament wrote company charters to regulate toxicity. The industry reached the U.S. around 1850 causing pollution and lawsuits.

In industrial cities local experts and reformers, especially after 1890, took the lead in identifying environmental degradation and pollution, and initiating grass-roots movements to demand and achieve reforms. Typically the highest priority went to water and air pollution. The Coal Smoke Abatement Society was formed in Britain in 1898 making it one of the oldest environmental non-governmental organizations. It was founded by artist William Blake Richmond, frustrated with the pall cast by coal smoke. Although there were earlier pieces of legislation, the Public Health Act 1875 required all furnaces and fireplaces to consume their own smoke. It also provided for sanctions against factories that emitted large amounts of black smoke. The provisions of this law were extended in 1926 with the Smoke Abatement Act to include other emissions, such as soot, ash, and gritty particles, and to empower local authorities to impose their own regulations.

Industrialisation beyond Great Britain

Continental Europe
The Industrial Revolution in continental Europe came later than in Great Britain. It started in Belgium and France, then spread to the German states by the middle of the 19th century. In many industries, this involved the application of technology developed in Britain in new places. Typically the technology was purchased from Britain or British engineers and entrepreneurs moved abroad in search of new opportunities. By 1809, part of the Ruhr Valley in Westphalia was called 'Miniature England' because of its similarities to the industrial areas of Britain. Most European governments provided state funding to the new industries. In some cases (such as iron), the different availability of resources locally meant that only some aspects of the British technology were adopted.Alan Milward and Samuel Berrick Saul, The Development of the Economies of Continental Europe 1850–1914 (Harvard UP, 1977).

Austria-Hungary

The Habsburg realms which became Austria-Hungary in 1867 included 23 million inhabitants in 1800, growing to 36 million by 1870. Nationally the per capita rate of industrial growth averaged about 3% between 1818 and 1870. However, there were strong regional differences. The railway system was built in the 1850–1873 period. Before they arrived transportation was very slow and expensive. In the Alpine and Bohemian (modern-day Czech Republic) regions, proto-industrialization began by 1750 and became the center of the first phases of the Industrial Revolution after 1800. The textile industry was the main factor, utilizing mechanization, steam engines, and the factory system. In the Czech lands, the "first mechanical loom followed in Varnsdorf in 1801", with the first steam engines appearing in Bohemia and Moravia just a few years later. The textile production flourished particularly in Prague and Brno (German: Brünn), which was considered the 'Moravian Manchester'. The Czech lands, especially Bohemia, became the center of industrialization due to its natural and human resources. The iron industry had developed in the Alpine regions after 1750, with smaller centers in Bohemia and Moravia. Hungary—the eastern half of the Dual Monarchy, was heavily rural with little industry before 1870.

In 1791, Prague organized the first World's Fair/List of world's fairs, Bohemia (modern-day Czech Republic). The first industrial exhibition was on the occasion of the coronation of Leopold II as a king of Bohemia, which took place in Clementinum, and therefore celebrated the considerable sophistication of manufacturing methods in the Czech lands during that time period.

Technological change accelerated industrialization and urbanization. The GNP per capita grew roughly 1.76% per year from 1870 to 1913. That level of growth compared very favorably to that of other European nations such as Britain (1%), France (1.06%), and Germany (1.51%). However, in a comparison with Germany and Britain: the Austro-Hungarian economy as a whole still lagged considerably, as sustained modernization had begun much later.

Belgium
Belgium was the second country in which the Industrial Revolution took place and the first in continental Europe: Wallonia (French-speaking southern Belgium) took the lead. Starting in the middle of the 1820s, and especially after Belgium became an independent nation in 1830, numerous works comprising coke blast furnaces as well as puddling and rolling mills were built in the coal mining areas around Liège and Charleroi. The leader was a transplanted Englishman John Cockerill. His factories at Seraing integrated all stages of production, from engineering to the supply of raw materials, as early as 1825.Milward and Saul, Economic Development of Continental Europe 1780–1870 pp 292–296, 437–453.

Wallonia exemplified the radical evolution of industrial expansion. Thanks to coal (the French word "houille" was coined in Wallonia), the region geared up to become the 2nd industrial power in the world after Britain. But it is also pointed out by many researchers, with its Sillon industriel, 'Especially in the Haine, Sambre and Meuse valleys, between the Borinage and Liège...there was a huge industrial development based on coal-mining and iron-making...'. Philippe Raxhon wrote about the period after 1830: "It was not propaganda but a reality the Walloon regions were becoming the second industrial power all over the world after Britain." "The sole industrial centre outside the collieries and blast furnaces of Walloon was the old cloth-making town of Ghent." Professor Michel De Coster stated: "The historians and the economists say that Belgium was the second industrial power of the world, in proportion to its population and its territory [...] But this rank is the one of Wallonia where the coal-mines, the blast furnaces, the iron and zinc factories, the wool industry, the glass industry, the weapons industry... were concentrated." Many of the 19th-century coal mines in Wallonia are now protected as World Heritage sites.

Wallonia was also the birthplace of a strong socialist party and strong trade unions in a particular sociological landscape. At the left, the Sillon industriel, which runs from Mons in the west, to Verviers in the east (except part of North Flanders, in another period of the industrial revolution, after 1920). Even if Belgium is the second industrial country after Britain, the effect of the industrial revolution there was very different. In 'Breaking stereotypes', Muriel Neven and Isabelle Devious say:

The Industrial Revolution changed a mainly rural society into an urban one, but with a strong contrast between northern and southern Belgium. During the Middle Ages and the early modern period, Flanders was characterised by the presence of large urban centres [...] at the beginning of the nineteenth century this region (Flanders), with an urbanisation degree of more than 30 percent, remained one of the most urbanised in the world. By comparison, this proportion reached only 17 percent in Wallonia, barely 10 percent in most West European countries, 16 percent in France, and 25 percent in Britain. Nineteenth-century industrialisation did not affect the traditional urban infrastructure, except in Ghent... Also, in Wallonia, the traditional urban network was largely unaffected by the industrialisation process, even though the proportion of city-dwellers rose from 17 to 45 percent between 1831 and 1910. Especially in the Haine, Sambre and Meuse valleys, between the Borinage and Liège, where there was a huge industrial development based on coal-mining and iron-making, urbanisation was fast. During these eighty years, the number of municipalities with more than 5,000 inhabitants increased from only 21 to more than one hundred, concentrating nearly half of the Walloon population in this region. Nevertheless, industrialisation remained quite traditional in the sense that it did not lead to the growth of modern and large urban centres, but to a conurbation of industrial villages and towns developed around a coal mine or a factory. Communication routes between these small centres only became populated later and created a much less dense urban morphology than, for instance, the area around Liège where the old town was there to direct migratory flows.

France
The industrial revolution in France followed a particular course as it did not correspond to the main model followed by other countries. Notably, most French historians argue France did not go through a clear take-off. Instead, France's economic growth and industrialisation process was slow and steady through the 18th and 19th centuries. However, some stages were identified by Maurice Lévy-Leboyer:
 French Revolution and Napoleonic Wars (1789–1815),
 industrialisation, along with Britain (1815–1860),
 economic slowdown (1860–1905),
 renewal of the growth after 1905.

Germany

Based on its leadership in chemical research in the universities and industrial laboratories, Germany, which was unified in 1871, became dominant in the world's chemical industry in the late 19th century. At first the production of dyes based on aniline was critical.

Germany's political disunitywith three dozen statesand a pervasive conservatism made it difficult to build railways in the 1830s. However, by the 1840s, trunk lines linked the major cities; each German state was responsible for the lines within its own borders. Lacking a technological base at first, the Germans imported their engineering and hardware from Britain, but quickly learned the skills needed to operate and expand the railways. In many cities, the new railway shops were the centres of technological awareness and training, so that by 1850, Germany was self-sufficient in meeting the demands of railroad construction, and the railways were a major impetus for the growth of the new steel industry. Observers found that even as late as 1890, their engineering was inferior to Britain's. However, German unification in 1870 stimulated consolidation, nationalisation into state-owned companies, and further rapid growth. Unlike the situation in France, the goal was the support of industrialisation, and so heavy lines crisscrossed the Ruhr and other industrial districts and provided good connections to the major ports of Hamburg and Bremen. By 1880, Germany had 9,400 locomotives pulling 43,000 passengers and 30,000 tons of freight, and pulled ahead of France.

Sweden

During the period 1790–1815 Sweden experienced two parallel economic movements: an agricultural revolution with larger agricultural estates, new crops, and farming tools and commercialisation of farming, and a proto industrialisation, with small industries being established in the countryside and with workers switching between agricultural work in summer and industrial production in winter. This led to economic growth benefiting large sections of the population and leading up to a consumption revolution starting in the 1820s. Between 1815 and 1850, the protoindustries developed into more specialised and larger industries. This period witnessed increasing regional specialisation with mining in Bergslagen, textile mills in Sjuhäradsbygden, and forestry in Norrland. Several important institutional changes took place in this period, such as free and mandatory schooling introduced in 1842 (as the first country in the world), the abolition of the national monopoly on trade in handicrafts in 1846, and a stock company law in 1848.

From 1850 to 1890, Sweden experienced its "first" Industrial Revolution with a veritable explosion in export, dominated by crops, wood, and steel. Sweden abolished most tariffs and other barriers to free trade in the 1850s and joined the gold standard in 1873. Large infrastructural investments were made during this period, mainly in the expanding railroad network, which was financed in part by the government and in part by private enterprises. From 1890 to 1930, new industries developed with their focus on the domestic market: mechanical engineering, power utilities, papermaking and textile.

Japan

The Industrial Revolution began about 1870 as Meiji period leaders decided to catch up with the West. The government built railroads, improved roads, and inaugurated a land reform program to prepare the country for further development. It inaugurated a new Western-based education system for all young people, sent thousands of students to the United States and Europe, and hired more than 3,000 Westerners to teach modern science, mathematics, technology, and foreign languages in Japan (Foreign government advisors in Meiji Japan).

In 1871, a group of Japanese politicians known as the Iwakura Mission toured Europe and the United States to learn Western ways. The result was a deliberate state-led industrialisation policy to enable Japan to quickly catch up. The Bank of Japan, founded in 1882, used taxes to fund model steel and textile factories. Education was expanded and Japanese students were sent to study in the West.

Modern industry first appeared in textiles, including cotton and especially silk, which was based in home workshops in rural areas.

United States

During the late 18th and early 19th centuries when the UK and parts of Western Europe began to industrialise, the US was primarily an agricultural and natural resource producing and processing economy. The building of roads and canals, the introduction of steamboats and the building of railroads were important for handling agricultural and natural resource products in the large and sparsely populated country of the period.

Important American technological contributions during the period of the Industrial Revolution were the cotton gin and the development of a system for making interchangeable parts, the latter aided by the development of the milling machine in the US.  The development of machine tools and the system of interchangeable parts was the basis for the rise of the US as the world's leading industrial nation in the late 19th century.

Oliver Evans invented an automated flour mill in the mid-1780s that used control mechanisms and conveyors so that no labour was needed from the time grain was loaded into the elevator buckets until the flour was discharged into a wagon.  This is considered to be the first modern materials handling system an important advance in the progress toward mass production.

The United States originally used horse-powered machinery for small-scale applications such as grain milling, but eventually switched to water power after textile factories began being built in the 1790s. As a result, industrialisation was concentrated in New England and the Northeastern United States, which has fast-moving rivers. The newer water-powered production lines proved more economical than horse-drawn production. In the late 19th century steam-powered manufacturing overtook water-powered manufacturing, allowing the industry to spread to the Midwest.

Thomas Somers and the Cabot Brothers founded the Beverly Cotton Manufactory in 1787, the first cotton mill in America, the largest cotton mill of its era, and a significant milestone in the research and development of cotton mills in the future. This mill was designed to use horsepower, but the operators quickly learned that the horse-drawn platform was economically unstable, and had economic losses for years. Despite the losses, the Manufactory served as a playground of innovation, both in turning a large amount of cotton, but also developing the water-powered milling structure used in Slater's Mill.

In 1793, Samuel Slater (1768–1835) founded the Slater Mill at Pawtucket, Rhode Island. He had learned of the new textile technologies as a boy apprentice in Derbyshire, England, and defied laws against the emigration of skilled workers by leaving for New York in 1789, hoping to make money with his knowledge. After founding Slater's Mill, he went on to own 13 textile mills. Daniel Day established a wool carding mill in the Blackstone Valley at Uxbridge, Massachusetts in 1809, the third woollen mill established in the US (The first was in Hartford, Connecticut, and the second at Watertown, Massachusetts.) The John H. Chafee Blackstone River Valley National Heritage Corridor retraces the history of "America's Hardest-Working River', the Blackstone. At its peak over 1,100 mills operated in this valley, including Slater's mill, and with it the earliest beginnings of America's industrial and technological development.

Merchant Francis Cabot Lowell from Newburyport, Massachusetts memorised the design of textile machines on his tour of British factories in 1810. Realising that the War of 1812 had ruined his import business but that demand for domestic finished cloth was emerging in America, on his return to the United States, he set up the Boston Manufacturing Company. Lowell and his partners built America's second cotton-to-cloth textile mill at Waltham, Massachusetts, second to the Beverly Cotton Manufactory. After his death in 1817, his associates built America's first planned factory town, which they named after him. This enterprise was capitalised in a public stock offering, one of the first uses of it in the United States. Lowell, Massachusetts, using  of canals and  delivered by the Merrimack River, is considered by some as a major contributor to the success of the American Industrial Revolution. The short-lived utopia-like Waltham-Lowell system was formed, as a direct response to the poor working conditions in Britain. However, by 1850, especially following the Great Famine of Ireland, the system had been replaced by poor immigrant labour.

A major U.S. contribution to industrialisation was the development of techniques to make interchangeable parts from metal.  Precision metal machining techniques were developed by the U.S. Department of War to make interchangeable parts for small firearms.  The development work took place at the Federal Arsenals at Springfield Armory and Harpers Ferry Armory.  Techniques for precision machining using machine tools included using fixtures to hold the parts in the proper position, jigs to guide the cutting tools and precision blocks and gauges to measure the accuracy.  The milling machine, a fundamental machine tool, is believed to have been invented by Eli Whitney, who was a government contractor who built firearms as part of this program.  Another important invention was the Blanchard lathe, invented by Thomas Blanchard.  The Blanchard lathe, or pattern tracing lathe, was actually a shaper that could produce copies of wooden gun stocks.  The use of machinery and the techniques for producing standardised and interchangeable parts became known as the American system of manufacturing.

Precision manufacturing techniques made it possible to build machines that mechanised the shoe industry and the watch industry. The industrialisation of the watch industry started in 1854 also in Waltham, Massachusetts, at the Waltham Watch Company, with the development of machine tools, gauges and assembling methods adapted to the micro precision required for watches.

Second Industrial Revolution

 
Steel is often cited as the first of several new areas for industrial mass-production, which are said to characterise a "Second Industrial Revolution", beginning around 1850, although a method for mass manufacture of steel was not invented until the 1860s, when Sir Henry Bessemer invented a new furnace which could convert molten pig iron into steel in large quantities. However, it only became widely available in the 1870s after the process was modified to produce more uniform quality. Bessemer steel was being displaced by the open hearth furnace near the end of the 19th century.

This Second Industrial Revolution gradually grew to include chemicals, mainly the chemical industries, petroleum (refining and distribution), and, in the 20th century, the automotive industry, and was marked by a transition of technological leadership from Britain to the United States and Germany.

The increasing availability of economical petroleum products also reduced the importance of coal and further widened the potential for industrialisation.

A new revolution began with electricity and electrification in the electrical industries. The introduction of hydroelectric power generation in the Alps enabled the rapid industrialisation of coal-deprived northern Italy, beginning in the 1890s.

By the 1890s, industrialisation in these areas had created the first giant industrial corporations with burgeoning global interests, as companies like U.S. Steel, General Electric, Standard Oil and Bayer AG joined the railroad and ship companies on the world's stock markets.

 New Industrialism 
The New Industrialist movement advocates for increasing domestic manufacturing while reducing emphasis on a financial-based economy that relies on real estate and trading speculative assets. New Industrialism has been described as "supply-side progressivism" or embracing the idea of "Building More Stuff". New Industrialism developed after the China Shock that resulted in lost manufacturing jobs in the U.S. after China joined the World Trade Organization in 2001. The movement strengthened after the reduction of manufacturing jobs during the Great Recession and when the U.S. was not able to manufacture enough tests or facemasks during the COVID-19 pandemic. New Industrialism calls for building enough housing to satisfy demand in order to reduce the profit in land speculation, to invest in infrastructure, and to develop advanced technology to manufacture green energy for the world. New Industrialists believe that the United States is not building enough productive capital and should invest more into economic growth.

Causes

The causes of the Industrial Revolution were complicated and remain a topic for debate.  Geographic factors include Britain's vast mineral resources.  In addition to metal ores, Britain had the highest quality coal reserves known at the time, as well as abundant water power, highly productive agriculture, and numerous seaports and navigable waterways.

Some historians believe the Industrial Revolution was an outgrowth of social and institutional changes brought by the end of feudalism in Britain after the English Civil War in the 17th century, although feudalism began to break down after the Black Death of the mid 14th century, followed by other epidemics, until the population reached a low in the 14th century. This created labour shortages and led to falling food prices and a peak in real wages around 1500, after which population growth began reducing wages. Inflation caused by coinage debasement after 1540 followed by precious metals supply increasing from the Americas caused land rents (often long-term leases that transferred to heirs on death) to fall in real terms.

The Enclosure movement and the British Agricultural Revolution made food production more efficient and less labour-intensive, forcing the farmers who could no longer be self-sufficient in agriculture into cottage industry, for example weaving, and in the longer term into the cities and the newly developed factories. The colonial expansion of the 17th century with the accompanying development of international trade, creation of financial markets and accumulation of capital are also cited as factors, as is the scientific revolution of the 17th century. A change in marrying patterns to getting married later made people able to accumulate more human capital during their youth, thereby encouraging economic development.

Until the 1980s, it was universally believed by academic historians that technological innovation was the heart of the Industrial Revolution and the key enabling technology was the invention and improvement of the steam engine. Marketing professor Ronald Fullerton suggested that innovative marketing techniques, business practices, and competition also influenced changes in the manufacturing industry.

Lewis Mumford has proposed that the Industrial Revolution had its origins in the Early Middle Ages, much earlier than most estimates. He explains that the model for standardised mass production was the printing press and that "the archetypal model for the industrial era was the clock". He also cites the monastic emphasis on order and time-keeping, as well as the fact that medieval cities had at their centre a church with bell ringing at regular intervals as being necessary precursors to a greater synchronisation necessary for later, more physical, manifestations such as the steam engine.

The presence of a large domestic market should also be considered an important driver of the Industrial Revolution, particularly explaining why it occurred in Britain. In other nations, such as France, markets were split up by local regions, which often imposed tolls and tariffs on goods traded among them. Internal tariffs were abolished by Henry VIII of England, they survived in Russia until 1753, 1789 in France and 1839 in Spain.

Governments' grant of limited monopolies to inventors under a developing patent system (the Statute of Monopolies in 1623) is considered an influential factor. The effects of patents, both good and ill, on the development of industrialisation are clearly illustrated in the history of the steam engine, the key enabling technology. In return for publicly revealing the workings of an invention the patent system rewarded inventors such as James Watt by allowing them to monopolise the production of the first steam engines, thereby rewarding inventors and increasing the pace of technological development. However, monopolies bring with them their own inefficiencies which may counterbalance, or even overbalance, the beneficial effects of publicising ingenuity and rewarding inventors. Watt's monopoly prevented other inventors, such as Richard Trevithick, William Murdoch, or Jonathan Hornblower, whom Boulton and Watt sued, from introducing improved steam engines, thereby retarding the spread of steam power.

Causes in Europe

One question of active interest to historians is why the Industrial Revolution occurred in Europe and not in other parts of the world in the 18th century, particularly China, India, and the Middle East (which pioneered in shipbuilding, textile production, water mills, and much more in the period between 750 and 1100), or at other times like in Classical Antiquity or the Middle Ages. A recent account argued that Europeans have been characterized for thousands of years by a freedom-loving culture originating from the aristocratic societies of early Indo-European invaders. Many historians, however, have challenged this explanation as being not only Eurocentric, but also ignoring historical context. In fact, before the Industrial Revolution, "there existed something of a global economic parity between the most advanced regions in the world economy." These historians have suggested a number of other factors, including education, technological changes (see Scientific Revolution in Europe), "modern" government, "modern" work attitudes, ecology, and culture.

China was the world's most technologically advanced country for many centuries; however, China stagnated economically and technologically and was surpassed by Western Europe before the Age of Discovery, by which time China banned imports and denied entry to foreigners. China was also a totalitarian society.  China also heavily taxed transported goods.A companion to the PBS Series "The Genius That Was China Modern estimates of per capita income in Western Europe in the late 18th century are of roughly 1,500 dollars in purchasing power parity (and Britain had a per capita income of nearly 2,000 dollars) whereas China, by comparison, had only 450 dollars. India was essentially feudal, politically fragmented and not as economically advanced as Western Europe.

Historians such as David Landes and sociologists Max Weber and Rodney Stark credit the different belief systems in Asia and Europe with dictating where the revolution occurred. The religion and beliefs of Europe were largely products of Judaeo-Christianity and Greek thought. Conversely, Chinese society was founded on men like Confucius, Mencius, Han Feizi (Legalism), Lao Tzu (Taoism), and Buddha (Buddhism), resulting in very different worldviews. Other factors include the considerable distance of China's coal deposits, though large, from its cities as well as the then unnavigable Yellow River that connects these deposits to the sea.

Regarding India, the Marxist historian Rajani Palme Dutt said: "The capital to finance the Industrial Revolution in India instead went into financing the Industrial Revolution in Britain." In contrast to China, India was split up into many competing kingdoms after the decline of the Mughal Empire, with the major ones in its aftermath including the Marathas, Sikhs, Bengal Subah, and Kingdom of Mysore. In addition, the economy was highly dependent on two sectorsagriculture of subsistence and cotton, and there appears to have been little technical innovation. It is believed that the vast amounts of wealth were largely stored away in palace treasuries by monarchs prior to the British take over.

Economic historian Joel Mokyr argued that political fragmentation (the presence of a large number of European states) made it possible for heterodox ideas to thrive, as entrepreneurs, innovators, ideologues and heretics could easily flee to a neighboring state in the event that the one state would try to suppress their ideas and activities. This is what set Europe apart from the technologically advanced, large unitary empires such as China and India by providing "an insurance against economic and technological stagnation". China had both a printing press and movable type, and India had similar levels of scientific and technological achievement as Europe in 1700, yet the Industrial Revolution would occur in Europe, not China or India.

In addition, Europe's monarchs desperately needed revenue, pushing them into alliances with their merchant classes. Small groups of merchants were granted monopolies and tax-collecting responsibilities in exchange for payments to the state. Located in a region "at the hub of the largest and most varied network of exchange in history", Europe advanced as the leader of the Industrial Revolution. In the Americas, Europeans found a windfall of silver, timber, fish, and maize, leading historian Peter Stearns to conclude that "Europe's Industrial Revolution stemmed in great part from Europe's ability to draw disproportionately on world resources."

Modern capitalism originated in the Italian city-states around the end of the first millennium. The city-states were prosperous cities that were independent from feudal lords. They were largely republics whose governments were typically composed of merchants, manufacturers, members of guilds, bankers and financiers. The Italian city-states built a network of branch banks in leading western European cities and introduced double entry bookkeeping. Italian commerce was supported by schools that taught numeracy in financial calculations through abacus schools.

Causes in Britain

Great Britain provided the legal and cultural foundations that enabled entrepreneurs to pioneer the Industrial Revolution. Key factors fostering this environment were:
 The period of peace and stability which followed the unification of England and Scotland
 There were no internal trade barriers, including between England and Scotland, or feudal tolls and tariffs, making Britain the "largest coherent market in Europe"
 The rule of law (enforcing property rights and respecting the sanctity of contracts)
 A straightforward legal system that allowed the formation of joint-stock companies (corporations)
 Free market (capitalism)
 Geographical and natural resource advantages of Great Britain were the fact that it had extensive coastlines and many navigable rivers in an age where water was the easiest means of transportation and Britain had the highest quality coal in Europe.  Britain also had a large number of sites for water power.

There were two main values that drove the Industrial Revolution in Britain. These values were self-interest and an entrepreneurial spirit. Because of these interests, many industrial advances were made that resulted in a huge increase in personal wealth and a consumer revolution. These advancements also greatly benefitted British society as a whole. Countries around the world started to recognise the changes and advancements in Britain and use them as an example to begin their own Industrial Revolutions.

A debate sparked by Trinidadian politician and historian Eric Williams in his work Capitalism and Slavery (1944) concerned the role of slavery in financing the Industrial Revolution. Williams argued that European capital amassed from slavery was vital in the early years of the revolution, contending that the rise of industrial capitalism was the driving force behind abolitionism instead of humanitarian motivations. These arguments led to significant historiographical debates among historians, with American historian Seymour Drescher critiquing Williams' arguments in Econocide (1977).

Instead, the greater liberalisation of trade from a large merchant base may have allowed Britain to produce and use emerging scientific and technological developments more effectively than countries with stronger monarchies, particularly China and Russia. Britain emerged from the Napoleonic Wars as the only European nation not ravaged by financial plunder and economic collapse, and having the only merchant fleet of any useful size (European merchant fleets were destroyed during the war by the Royal Navy). Britain's extensive exporting cottage industries also ensured markets were already available for many early forms of manufactured goods. The conflict resulted in most British warfare being conducted overseas, reducing the devastating effects of territorial conquest that affected much of Europe. This was further aided by Britain's geographical positionan island separated from the rest of mainland Europe.

Another theory is that Britain was able to succeed in the Industrial Revolution due to the availability of key resources it possessed. It had a dense population for its small geographical size. Enclosure of common land and the related agricultural revolution made a supply of this labour readily available. There was also a local coincidence of natural resources in the North of England, the English Midlands, South Wales and the Scottish Lowlands. Local supplies of coal, iron, lead, copper, tin, limestone and water power resulted in excellent conditions for the development and expansion of industry. Also, the damp, mild weather conditions of the North West of England provided ideal conditions for the spinning of cotton, providing a natural starting point for the birth of the textiles industry.

The stable political situation in Britain from around 1689 following the Glorious Revolution, and British society's greater receptiveness to change (compared with other European countries) can also be said to be factors favouring the Industrial Revolution. Peasant resistance to industrialisation was largely eliminated by the Enclosure movement, and the landed upper classes developed commercial interests that made them pioneers in removing obstacles to the growth of capitalism. (This point is also made in Hilaire Belloc's The Servile State.)

The French philosopher Voltaire wrote about capitalism and religious tolerance in his book on English society, Letters on the English (1733), noting why England at that time was more prosperous in comparison to the country's less religiously tolerant European neighbours. "Take a view of the Royal Exchange in London, a place more venerable than many courts of justice, where the representatives of all nations meet for the benefit of mankind. There the Jew, the Mahometan [Muslim], and the Christian transact together, as though they all professed the same religion, and give the name of infidel to none but bankrupts. There the Presbyterian confides in the Anabaptist, and the Churchman depends on the Quaker's word. If one religion only were allowed in England, the Government would very possibly become arbitrary; if there were but two, the people would cut one another's throats; but as there are such a multitude, they all live happy and in peace."

Britain's population grew 280% 1550–1820, while the rest of Western Europe grew 50–80%. Seventy percent of European urbanisation happened in Britain 1750–1800. By 1800, only the Netherlands was more urbanised than Britain. This was only possible because coal, coke, imported cotton, brick and slate had replaced wood, charcoal, flax, peat and thatch. The latter compete with land grown to feed people while mined materials do not. Yet more land would be freed when chemical fertilisers replaced manure and horse's work was mechanised. A workhorse needs  for fodder while even early steam engines produced four times more mechanical energy.

In 1700, five-sixths of the coal mined worldwide was in Britain, while the Netherlands had none; so despite having Europe's best transport, lowest taxes, and most urbanised, well-paid, and literate population, it failed to industrialise. In the 18th century, it was the only European country whose cities and population shrank. Without coal, Britain would have run out of suitable river sites for mills by the 1830s. Based on science and experimentation from the continent, the steam engine was developed specifically for pumping water out of mines, many of which in Britain had been mined to below the water table. Although extremely inefficient they were economical because they used unsaleable coal. Iron rails were developed to transport coal, which was a major economic sector in Britain.

Economic historian Robert Allen has argued that high wages, cheap capital and very cheap energy in Britain made it the ideal place for the industrial revolution to occur. These factors made it vastly more profitable to invest in research and development, and to put technology to use in Britain than other societies. However, two 2018 studies in The Economic History Review showed that wages were not particularly high in the British spinning sector or the construction sector, casting doubt on Allen's explanation. A 2022 study in the Journal of Political Economy by Morgan Kelly, Joel Mokyr, and Cormac O Grada found that industrialization happened in areas with low wages and high mechanical skills, whereas literacy, banks and proximity to coal had little explanatory power.

Transfer of knowledge

Knowledge of innovation was spread by several means. Workers who were trained in the technique might move to another employer or might be poached. A common method was for someone to make a study tour, gathering information where he could. During the whole of the Industrial Revolution and for the century before, all European countries and America engaged in study-touring; some nations, like Sweden and France, even trained civil servants or technicians to undertake it as a matter of state policy. In other countries, notably Britain and America, this practice was carried out by individual manufacturers eager to improve their own methods. Study tours were common then, as now, as was the keeping of travel diaries. Records made by industrialists and technicians of the period are an incomparable source of information about their methods.

Another means for the spread of innovation was by the network of informal philosophical societies, like the Lunar Society of Birmingham, in which members met to discuss 'natural philosophy' (i.e. science) and often its application to manufacturing. The Lunar Society flourished from 1765 to 1809, and it has been said of them, "They were, if you like, the revolutionary committee of that most far reaching of all the eighteenth-century revolutions, the Industrial Revolution". Other such societies published volumes of proceedings and transactions. For example, the London-based Royal Society of Arts published an illustrated volume of new inventions, as well as papers about them in its annual Transactions.

There were publications describing technology. Encyclopaedias such as Harris's Lexicon Technicum (1704) and Abraham Rees's Cyclopaedia (1802–1819) contain much of value. Cyclopaedia contains an enormous amount of information about the science and technology of the first half of the Industrial Revolution, very well illustrated by fine engravings. Foreign printed sources such as the Descriptions des Arts et Métiers and Diderot's Encyclopédie explained foreign methods with fine engraved plates.

Periodical publications about manufacturing and technology began to appear in the last decade of the 18th century, and many regularly included notice of the latest patents. Foreign periodicals, such as the Annales des Mines, published accounts of travels made by French engineers who observed British methods on study tours.

Protestant work ethic

Another theory is that the British advance was due to the presence of an entrepreneurial class which believed in progress, technology and hard work. The existence of this class is often linked to the Protestant work ethic (see Max Weber) and the particular status of the Baptists and the dissenting Protestant sects, such as the Quakers and Presbyterians that had flourished with the English Civil War. Reinforcement of confidence in the rule of law, which followed establishment of the prototype of constitutional monarchy in Britain in the Glorious Revolution of 1688, and the emergence of a stable financial market there based on the management of the national debt by the Bank of England, contributed to the capacity for, and interest in, private financial investment in industrial ventures.

Dissenters found themselves barred or discouraged from almost all public offices, as well as education at England's only two universities at the time (although dissenters were still free to study at Scotland's four universities). When the restoration of the monarchy took place and membership in the official Anglican Church became mandatory due to the Test Act, they thereupon became active in banking, manufacturing and education. The Unitarians, in particular, were very involved in education, by running Dissenting Academies, where, in contrast to the universities of Oxford and Cambridge and schools such as Eton and Harrow, much attention was given to mathematics and the sciences – areas of scholarship vital to the development of manufacturing technologies.

Historians sometimes consider this social factor to be extremely important, along with the nature of the national economies involved. While members of these sects were excluded from certain circles of the government, they were considered fellow Protestants, to a limited extent, by many in the middle class, such as traditional financiers or other businessmen. Given this relative tolerance and the supply of capital, the natural outlet for the more enterprising members of these sects would be to seek new opportunities in the technologies created in the wake of the scientific revolution of the 17th century.

Criticisms
The industrial revolution has been criticised for causing ecological collapse, mental illness, pollution and detrimental social systems. It has also been criticised for valuing profits and corporate growth over life and wellbeing. Multiple movements have arisen which reject aspects of the industrial revolution, such as the Amish or primitivists.

Individualism humanism and harsh conditions

Humanists and individualists criticise the Industrial revolution for mistreating women and children and turning men into work machines that lacked autonomy. Critics of the Industrial revolution promoted a more interventionist state and formed new organizations to promote human rights.

Primitivism

Primitivism argues that the Industrial Revolution have created an un-natural frame of society and the world in which humans need to adapt to an un-natural urban landscape in which humans are perpetual cogs without personal autonomy.

Certain primitivists argue for a return to pre-industrial society, while others argue that technology such as modern medicine, and agriculture are all positive for humanity assuming they controlled and serve humanity and have no effect on the natural environment.

Pollution and ecological collapse

The Industrial Revolution has been criticised for leading to immense ecological and habitat destruction, certain studies state that over 95% of species have gone extinct since humanity became the dominant species on earth. It has also led to immense decrease in the biodiversity of life on earth. The Industrial revolution has been stated as is inherently unsustainable and will lead to eventual collapse of society, mass hunger, starvation, and resource scarcity.

The Anthropocene
The Anthropocene is a proposed epoch or mass extinction coming from humanity (Anthro is the Greek root for humanity). Since the start of the Industrial revolution humanity has permanently changed the earth, such as immense decrease in biodiversity, and mass extinction caused by the Industrial revolution. The effects include permanent changes to the earth's atmosphere and soil, forests, the mass destruction of the Industrial revolution has led to catastrophic impacts on the earth. Most organisms are unable to adapt leading to mass extinction with the remaining undergoing evolutionary rescue, as a result of the Industrial revolution.

Permanent changes in the distribution of organisms from human influence will become identifiable in the geologic record. Researchers have documented the movement of many species into regions formerly too cold for them, often at rates faster than initially expected. This has occurred in part as a result of changing climate, but also in response to farming and fishing, and to the accidental introduction of non-native species to new areas through global travel. The ecosystem of the entire Black Sea may have changed during the last 2000 years as a result of nutrient and silica input from eroding deforested lands along the Danube River.

Opposition from Romanticism

During the Industrial Revolution, an intellectual and artistic hostility towards the new industrialisation developed, associated with the Romantic movement.  Romanticism revered the traditionalism of rural life and recoiled against the upheavals caused by industrialization, urbanization and the wretchedness of the working classes. Its major exponents in English included the artist and poet William Blake and poets William Wordsworth, Samuel Taylor Coleridge, John Keats, Lord Byron and Percy Bysshe Shelley. The movement stressed the importance of "nature" in art and language, in contrast to "monstrous" machines and factories; the "Dark satanic mills" of Blake's poem "And did those feet in ancient time". Mary Shelley's Frankenstein reflected concerns that scientific progress might be two-edged. French Romanticism likewise was highly critical of industry.

See also

 Capitalist mode of production
 Industrialization of China
 Economic history of the United Kingdom
 Fourth Industrial Revolution
 History of capitalism
 Industrial Age
 Industrial society
 Law of the handicap of a head start – Dialectics of progress
 Machine Age
 The Protestant Ethic and the Spirit of Capitalism Steam
 Textile manufacture during the British Industrial Revolution, a good description of the early industrial revolution

Footnotes

References

Further reading

 
 
 
 
 Chambliss, William J. (editor), Problems of Industrial Society, Reading, Massachusetts: Addison-Wesley Publishing Co, 1973. 
  online
 Cipolla, Carlo M. The Fontana Economic History of Europe, vol. 3: The Industrial Revolution (1973)
 Cipolla, Carlo M. The Fontana Economic History of Europe: The Emergence of industrial societies vol 4 part 1 (1973) covers France, Germany, Britain, Habsburg Empire (Austria), Italy, and Low Countries. online
 Cipolla, Carlo M. The Fontana Economic History of Europe: The Emergence of industrial societies (1973) vol 4 part 2 covers topics online
 Clapham, J.H. (1930) An Economic History of Modern Britain: The Early Railway Age, 1820–1850 (2nd ed. 1930) online
 Clapham, J.H. The Economic Development of France and Germany: 1815–1914 (1921) online, a famous classic, filled with details.
 
 Crafts, Nicholas. "The first industrial revolution: Resolving the slow growth/rapid industrialization paradox." Journal of the European Economic Association 3.2–3 (2005): 525–534. online
 
 
 
 
 
 Green, Constance Mclaughlin. (1939) Holyoke Massachusetts A Case History Of The Industrial Revolution In America online
 
 
 
 
 
 
 
 
 Kornblith, Gary. The Industrial Revolution in America  (1997)
 
 
 
 
 
 
 
 Milward, Alan S. and S.B. Saul. The Development of the Economies of Continental Europe: 1850–1914 (1977)
 Milward, Alan S. and S.B. Saul. The Economic Development of Continental Europe 1780–1870 (1973)
 Mokyr, Joel. The British industrial revolution: an economic perspective (Routledge, 2018).

 Olson, James S. Encyclopedia of the Industrial Revolution in America (2001)
 Pollard, Sidney. Peaceful Conquest: The Industrialization of Europe, 1760–1970 (Oxford University Press, 1981).
 
 Rider, Christine, ed. Encyclopedia of the Age of the Industrial Revolution, 1700–1920 (2 vol. 2007)
 . Reprinted by McGraw-Hill, New York and London, 1926; and by Lindsay Publications, Inc., Bradley, Illinois,.
 Smelser, Neil J. Social Change in the Industrial Revolution: An Application of Theory to the British Cotton Industry (U of Chicago Press, 1959).
 Staley, David J. ed. Encyclopedia of the History of Invention and Technology (3 vol 2011), 2000 pp 
 
 
 
 
 
 
 
 
 ‌Zmolek, Michael Andrew. Rethinking the industrial revolution: five centuries of transition from agrarian to industrial capitalism in England (2013)

Historiography
 Cannadine, David. "The Present and the Past in the English Industrial Revolution 1880–1980". Past & Present, no. 103, (1984), pp. 131–172. online
 Grinin, Leonid. "The European revolutions and revolutionary waves of the 19th century: Their causes and consequences." in Handbook of Revolutions in the 21st Century (Springer, Cham, 2022) pp. 281–313.

 Hawke, Gary. "Reinterpretations of the Industrial Revolution" in Patrick O'Brien and Roland Quinault, eds. The Industrial Revolution and British Society (1993) pp. 54–78
 
 Kelly, Morgan, Joel Mokyr, and Cormac Ó. Gráda. "The mechanics of the Industrial Revolution." (2020). online

 
 Wrigley, E. Anthony. "Reconsidering the Industrial Revolution: England and Wales." Journal of Interdisciplinary History'' 49.01 (2018): 9–42.

External links

 Internet Modern History Sourcebook: Industrial Revolution
 BBC History Home Page: Industrial Revolution
 National Museum of Science and Industry website: machines and personalities
 Factory Workers in the Industrial Revolution
 The Industrial Revolution – Articles, Video, Pictures, and Facts
 "The Day the World Took Off" Six-part video series from the University of Cambridge tracing the question "Why did the Industrial Revolution begin when and where it did."

 
Industrial history
History of technology
18th century in technology
19th century in technology
Early Modern Britain
Late modern Europe
Modern history of the United Kingdom
Revolutions by type
Stages of history
Age of Revolution